= Xanthochromism =

Unusual yellow pigmentation

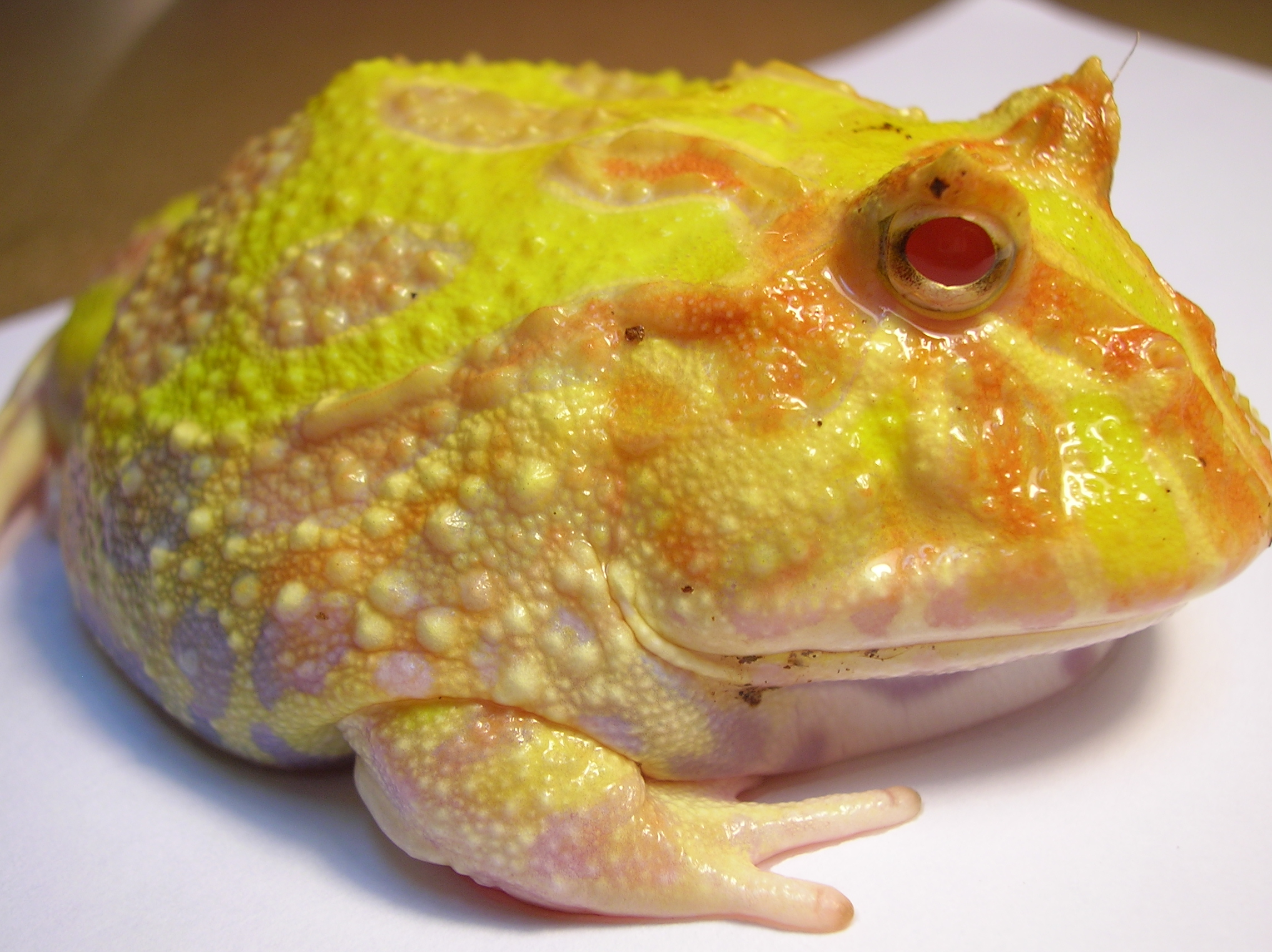
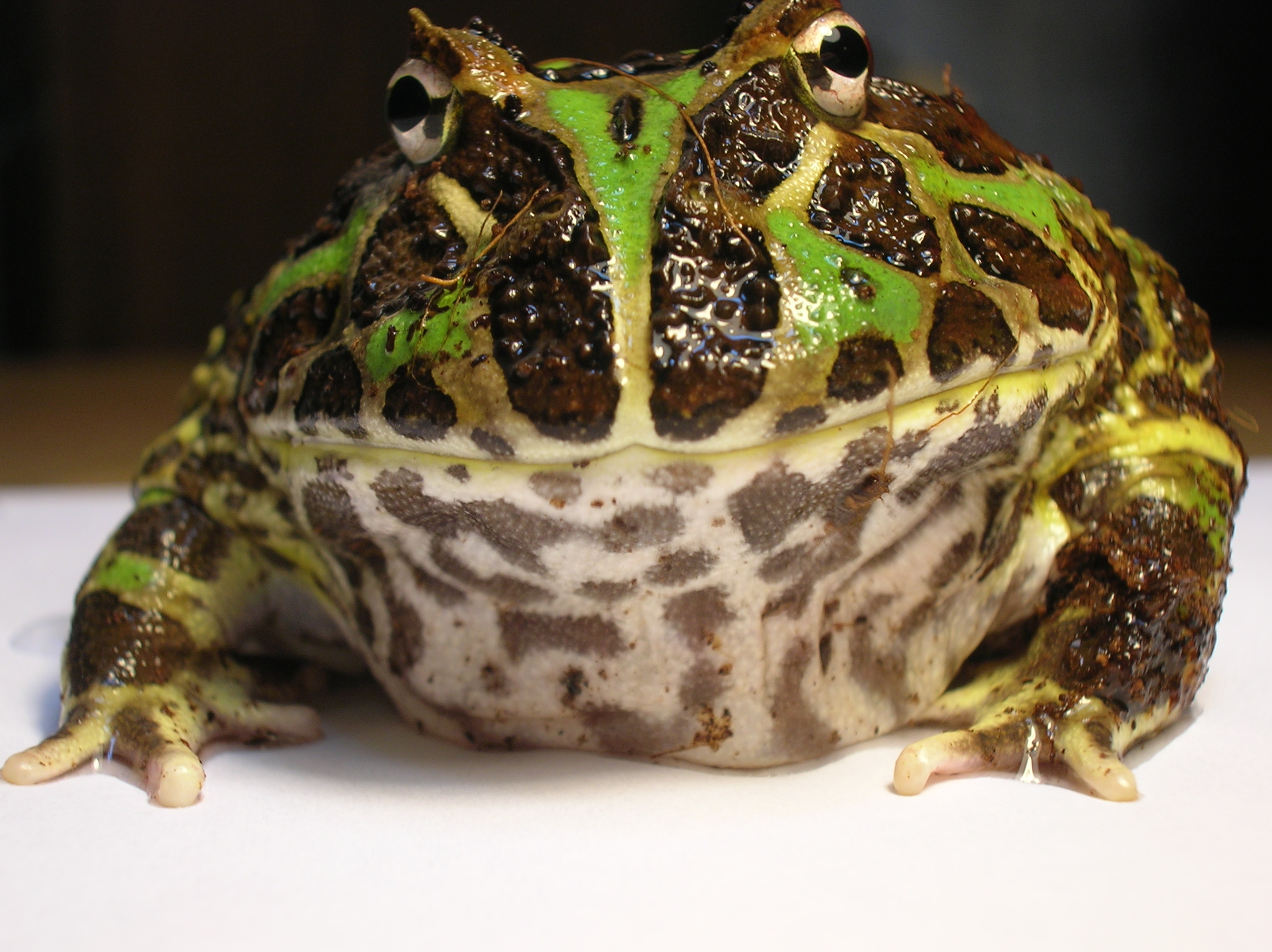
A xanthochromistic and normal Argentine horned frog

Xanthochromism (also called xanthochroism or xanthism), from the Greek xanthos (yellow) and chroma (color), is an unusually yellow pigmentation in an animal. It is often associated with the lack of usual red pigmentation and its replacement with yellow. The cause is usually genetic but may also be related to the animal's diet. The opposite of xanthochromism, a deficiency in or complete absence of yellow pigment, is known as axanthism.

== Birds ==
Birds exhibiting genetic xanthochromism, especially deliberately bred mutations of several species of parrot in aviculture, are termed "lutinos". Wild birds in which xanthochromism has been recorded include yellow wagtail, wood warbler, Cape May warbler, rose-breasted grosbeak, evening grosbeak, painted bunting, red-bellied woodpecker, scarlet tanager, northern cardinal, great spotted woodpecker, common tailorbird, crimson-breasted shrike, kākāriki and kea. A Cornell University survey of unusual-looking birds visiting feeders reported that 4% of such birds were described as xanthochromistic (compared with 76% albinistic).

== Fish ==
Xanthochromism is widely documented in fish, with the cases documented in:

- Amberjack (Seriola rivoliana),
- Barracuda (Sphyraena putnamae),
- Bream (Abramis brama),
- Burbot (Lota lota),
- Char (Salvelinus malma),
- Chubs (Kyphosus bigibbus, Kyphosus sectatrix),
- Cod (Gadus morhua),
- Damselfish (Stegastes arcifrons, Stegastes fuscus, Stegastes acapulcoensis, Stegastes pictus),
- Emperor (Lethrinus nebulosus),
- Flathead catfish (Pylodictis olivaris),
- Flounder (Paralichthys lethostigma, Paralichthys olivaceus, Microstomus achne, Microstomus pacificus, Platichthys bicoloratus),
- Groupers (Epinephelus areolatus, Epinephelus drummondhayi, Epinephelus marginatus, Epinephelus morio, Epinephelus quoyanus, Mycteroperca fusca, Mycteroperca olfax, Mycteroperca rosacea),
- Grunt (Anisotremus davidsonii),
- Haddock (Melanogrammus aeglefinus),
- Hake (Merluccius merluccius),
- Hogchoker (Trinectes maculatus),
- Horn shark (Heterodontus portusjacksoni),
- Jack mackerels (Trachurus declivis, Trachurus mediterraneus),
- Monkfish (Lophius budegassa, Lophius piscatorius),
- Mullet (Chelon ramada),
- Nurse shark (Ginglymostoma cirratum),
- Palette tang (Paracanthurus hepatus),
- Pollocks (Pollachius pollachius, Theragra chalcogramma),
- Ricefish (Oryzias latipes),
- River eel (Anguilla anguilla, Anguilla reinhardtii, Anguilla dieffenbachii),
- Rockfish (Sebastes flavidus, Sebastes miniatus, Sebastes entomelas, Sebastes nebulosus, Sebastes rastrelliger, Sebastes paucispinis, Sebastes rubrivinctus, Sebastes trivittatus, Sebastes koreanus),
- Rockling (Gaidropsarus vulgaris),
- Round ray (Urotrygon asterias)
- Sablefish (Anoplopoma fimbria),
- Salmon (Oncorhynchus keta, Oncorhynchus nerka),
- Seabream (Diplodus sargus, Diplodus vulgaris, Diplodus puntazzo),
- Seahorse (Hippocampus guttulatus),
- Silver carp (Hypophthalmichthys molitrix),
- Skates (Raja montagui, Raja brachyura, Leucoraja naevus, Leucoraja fullonica),
- Sole (Solea solea, Dicologlossa cuneata),
- Spanish mackerel (Scomberomorus commerson),
- Snook (Centropomus undecimalis),
- Stingray (Dasyatis pastinaca),
- Toadfish (Opsanus beta),
- Trevally (Carangoides bajad),
- Tripletail (Lobotes surinamensis),
- Trunkfish (Lactophrys triqueter),
- Weever (Trachinus radiatus),

Xanthic goldfish (sometimes defined as being amelanotic, though are considered distinct from albinistic goldfish) are commonly used to study the development of pigmentation as they possess only two types of pigment cells: xanthopores and iridophores.

== See also ==
- Albinism
  - Albinism in biology
  - Albino and white squirrels
- Amelanism
- Carotenosis
- Dyschromia
- Erythrism
- Heterochromia iridum
- Leucism
- Melanism
- Piebaldism
