= Plumage =

Layer of feathers that covers a bird

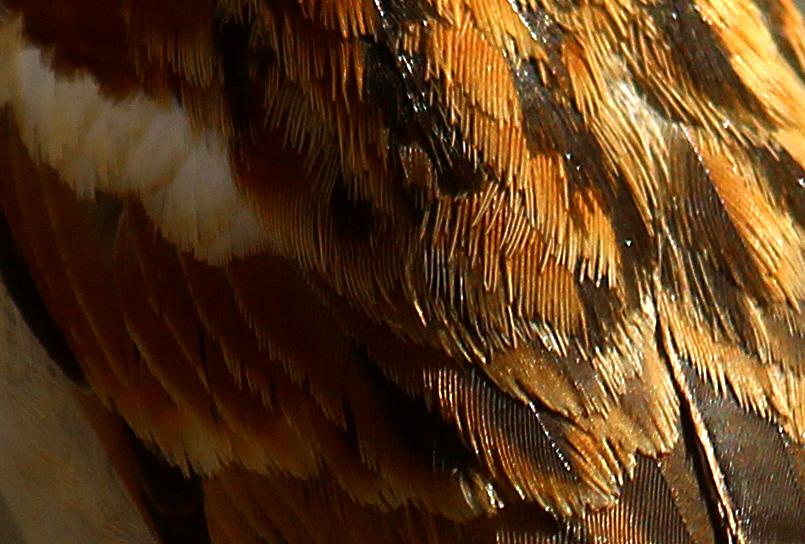
Close-up view of the plumage on a house sparrow

Plumage (from Latin pluma 'feather'), or feathering, is a layer of feathers that covers a bird and the pattern, colour, and arrangement of those feathers. The pattern and colours of plumage differ between species and subspecies and may vary with sex and age classes. Within a few species, there can be different colour morphs. The placement of feathers on a bird is not haphazard but rather emerges in organised, overlapping rows and groups, and these feather tracts are known by standard names.

Most birds moult twice a year, resulting in a breeding plumage and a non-breeding plumage; one of the moults, usually the one just after breeding, is a complete moult replacing all the feathers; the other, usually the one just before breeding, is often only a partial moult, with new small body feathers but not replacing the larger flight feathers in the wings and tail. Some very large birds, like eagles, replace their flight feathers slowly but continuously throughout the year, to minimise loss of flight efficiency. Many ducks and some other species such as the red junglefowl have males wearing a bright plumage while breeding and a drab eclipse plumage for some months afterward. Many passerine species have only one moult per year, with changes in plumage resulting from the wear of differently-coloured feather tips. Young birds have a juvenile plumage, which is replaced in the months after fledging by the first-winter plumage; in long-lived birds with slow maturation like gulls, this is followed by a succession of second, third, and sometimes fourth year immature plumages.

Plumology (or plumage science) is the name for the science that is associated with the study of feathers.

== Eclipse plumage ==
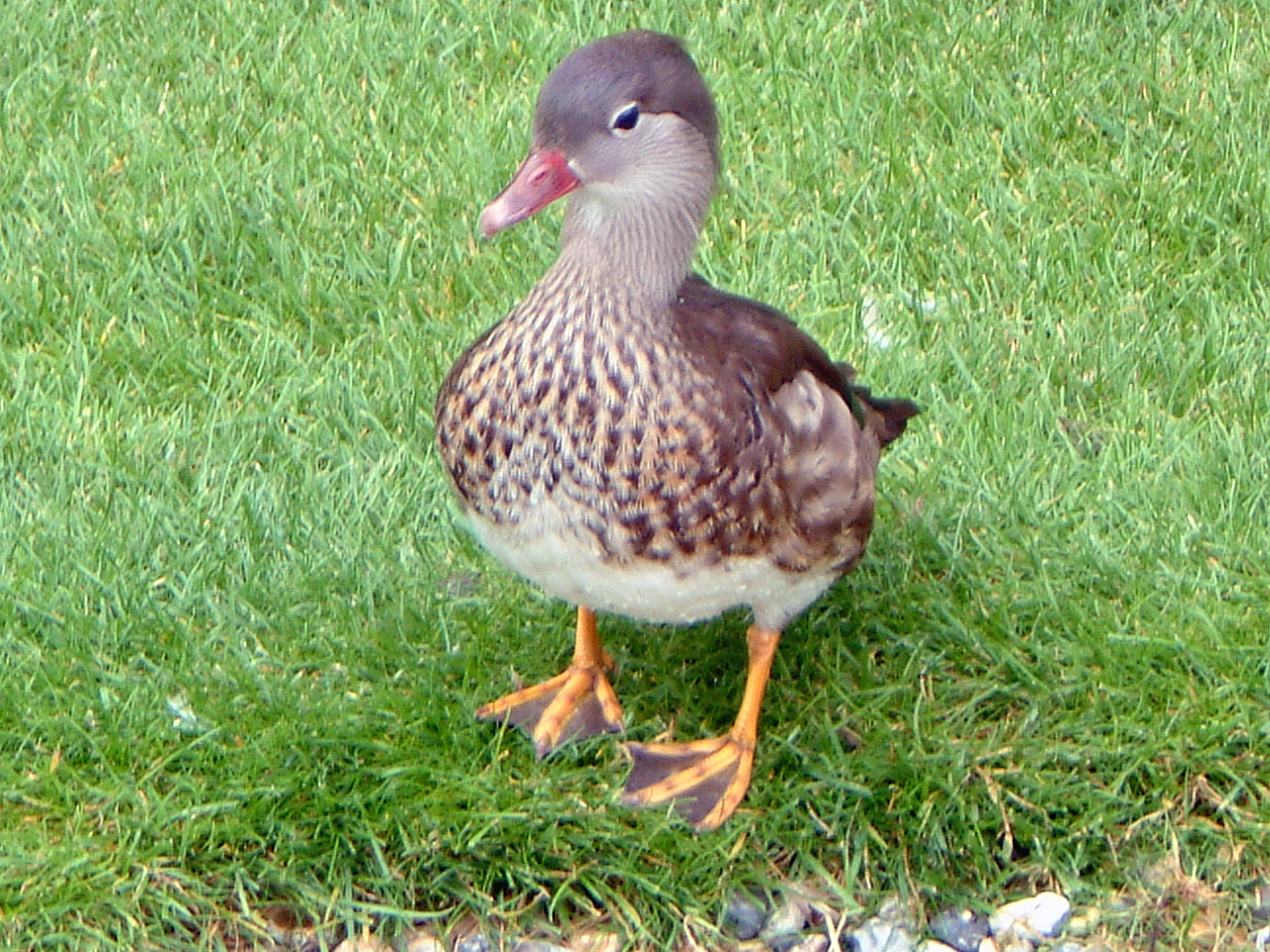
Mandarin duck (male) in eclipse plumage

Many male ducks in the family Anatidae have bright, colourful plumage, exhibiting strong sexual dimorphism. However, they moult into a dull plumage after breeding in mid-summer. This drab, female-like appearance is called eclipse plumage. They shed all their flight feathers simultaneously when in eclipse, becoming flightless for a short period. Some duck species remain in eclipse for one to three months in the late summer to early winter, while others retain the cryptic plumage until the next spring when they undergo another moult to return to their breeding plumage.

Although mainly found in the Anatidae, a few other species, including red junglefowl, most fairywrens^{[a]} and some sunbirds also have an eclipse plumage. In the superb and splendid fairywrens, very old males (over about four years) may moult from one breeding plumage to another whereas in the red-backed and white-winged fairywrens, males do not acquire breeding plumage until four years old, well after they become sexually mature and indeed longer than the vast majority of individuals live.

In contrast to the ducks, males of hummingbirds and most lek-mating passerines – like the Guianan cock-of-the-rock or birds of paradise – retain their exuberant plumage and sexual dimorphism at all times, moulting as ordinary birds do once annually.

== Polymorphism ==
In some birds, including many true owls (Strigidae), some nightjars (Caprimulgidae), some skuas (Stercorariidae), and a few cuckoos (Cuculus and relatives) being widely known examples, there is colour polymorphism in plumage. This means that two or more colour variants occur within their populations during all or at least most seasons and plumages; in the above-mentioned examples a brown (phaeomelanin) and grey (eumelanin) morph exist, termed "hepatic form" particularly in the cuckoos. Other cases of natural polymorphism are of various kinds; many are melanic/nonmelanic (some paradise-flycatchers, Terpsiphone, for example), but more unusual types of polymorphism exist – the face colour of the Gouldian finch (Erythrura gouldiae) or the courtship types of male ruffs (Calidris pugnax).

== Humphrey–Parkes (H–P) moult and plumage terminology ==
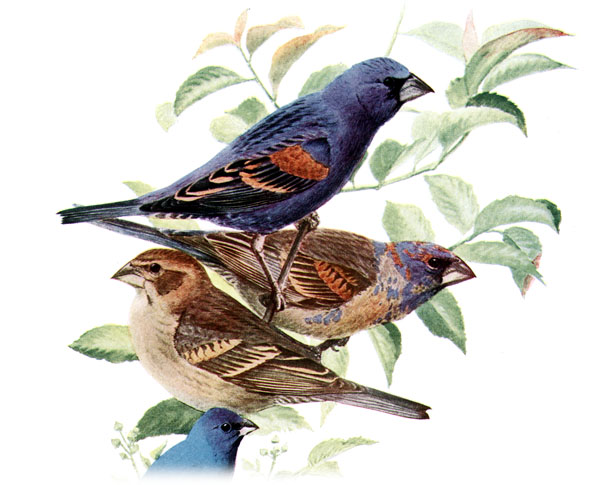
The differences in plumage of a blue grosbeak, from top to bottom, between a breeding male ("alternate" plumage), a non-breeding male ("basic" plumage), a female, and the related indigo bunting.

The Humphrey–Parkes terminology is a naming system developed by a small group of ornithologists in the USA, using its own specialist names for plumages. The annual moult after the breeding season, is known in it as the pre-basic moult. This resulting covering of feathers, which will last either until the next breeding season or until the next annual moult, is known as the basic plumage. Many species undertake another moult before the breeding season known as the pre-alternate moult, the resulting breeding plumage being known as the alternate or nuptial plumage. The alternate plumage is often brighter than the basic plumage, for sexual display, but may also be cryptic to hide incubating birds that might be vulnerable on the nest.

The Humphrey–Parkes terminology requires attention to detail to name moults and plumages to its systems. Compared to the traditional life-cycle-based terminology described above, it has been criticised for its use of obscure counterintuitive jargon and spellings, and as a result is little-known outside of a small circle of professional users in the United States, and effectively unknown elsewhere.

== Abnormal plumages ==
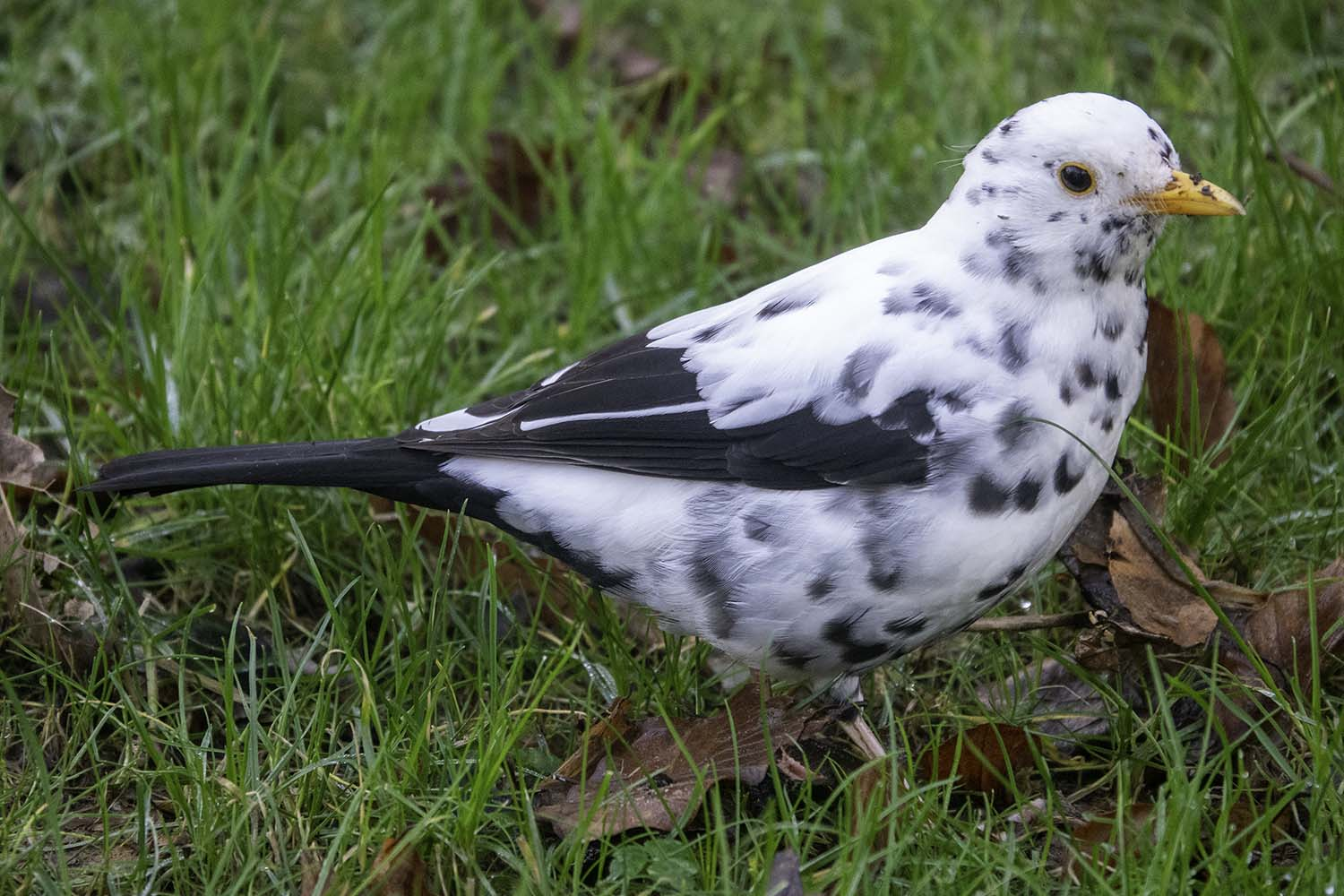
An incomplete leucistic common blackbird.

Abnormal plumages include a variety of conditions. Albinism, total loss of colour, is rare, but partial loss of colours is more common. Some species are colour polymorphic, having two or more colour variants. A few species have special types of polymorphism, as in the male ruff which has an assortment of different colours around the head and neck in the breeding season only.

There are hereditary as well as non-hereditary variations in plumage that are rare and termed abnormal or aberrant plumages. Melanism refers to an excess of black or dark colours. Erythromelanism or erythrism is the result of excessive reddish-brown erythromelanin deposition in feathers that normally lack melanin. Melanin of different forms combine with xanthophylls to produce colour mixtures and when this combination is imbalanced it produces colour shifts that are termed schizochroisms, including xanthochromism (an overabundance of yellow), and axanthism (a lack of yellow), which are commonly bred in cagebirds such as budgerigars). A reduction in eumelanin leads to non-eumelanin schizochroism with an overall fawn plumage while a lack of phaeomelanin results in grey-coloured non-phaeomelanin schizochroism. Carotenism refers to the abnormal distribution of carotenoid pigments.

The term "dilution" is used for situations where the colour is of a lower intensity overall; it is caused by decreased deposition of pigment in the developing feather, and can thus not occur in structural coloration (i.e., "dilute blue" does not exist); pale structural colours are instead achieved by shifting the peak wavelength at which light is refracted. Dilution regularly occurs in normal plumage (grey, buff, pink and cream colours are usually produced by this process), but may in addition occur as an aberration (e.g., all normally black plumage becoming grey).

=== Albinism ===
Albinism in birds is rare, occurring to any extent in perhaps one in 1800 individuals. It involves loss of colour in all parts including the iris of the eyes, bills, skin, legs, and feet. It is usually the result of a genetic mutation causing the absence of tyrosinase, an enzyme essential for melanin synthesis. Leucism (which includes what used to be termed as "partial albinism") refers to loss of pigments in some or all parts of feathers. A bird that is albino (from the Latin albus, "white") has white feathers in place of coloured ones on some portion of its body. A bird that is naturally white, such as a swan, goose, or egret, is not an albino, nor is a bird that has seasonally alternating white plumage.

Four degrees of albinism have been described. The most common form is termed partial albinism, in which local areas of the bird's body, such as certain feathers, are lacking the pigment melanin. The white areas may be symmetrical, with both sides of the bird showing a similar pattern. In imperfect albinism, the pigment is partially inhibited in the skin, eyes, or feathers, but is not absent from any of them. Incomplete albinism is the complete absence of pigment from the skin, eyes, or feathers, but not all three.

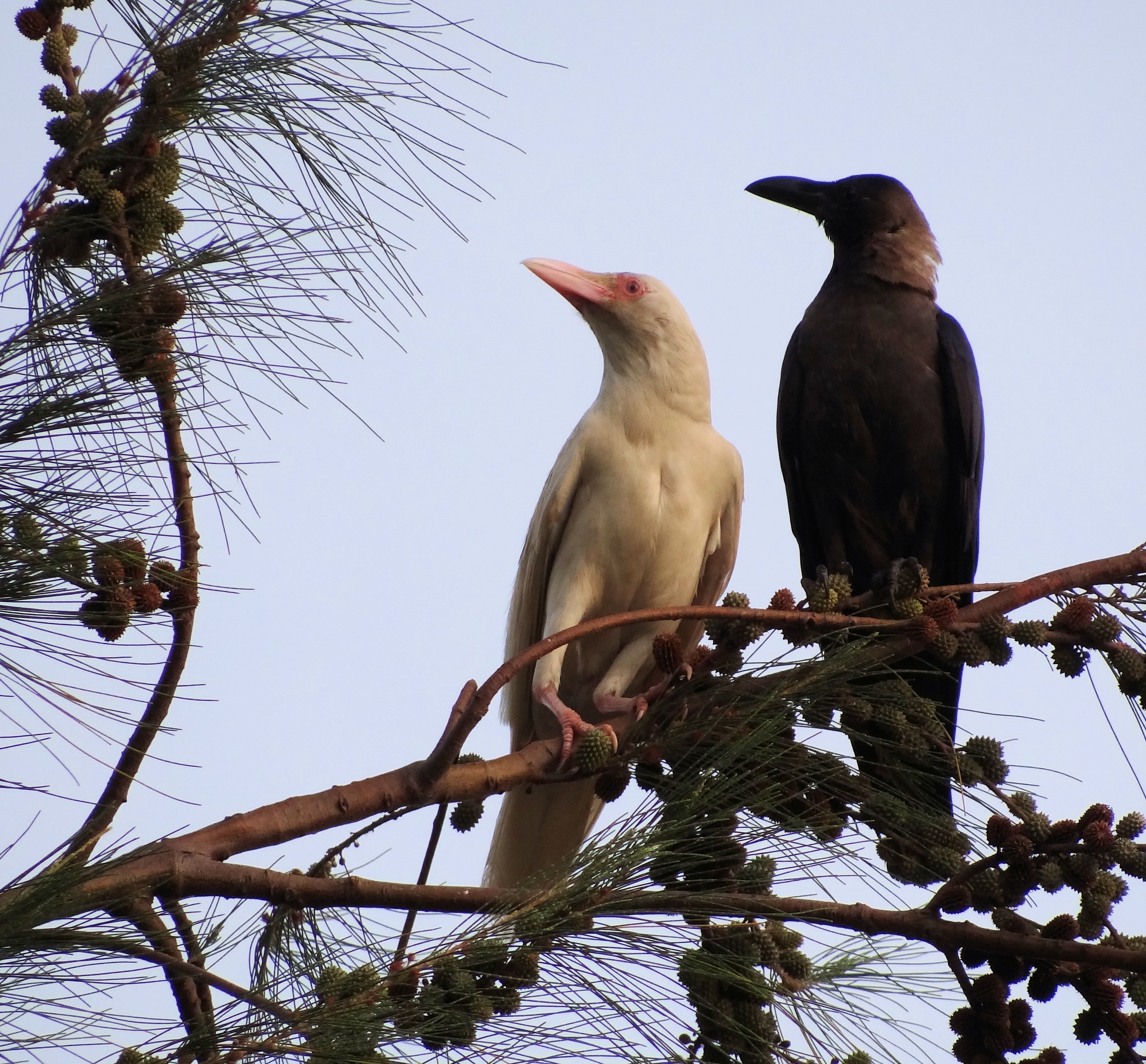
An albino juvenile house crow in Malacca, Malaysia, next to its normal-coloured parent

A completely albino bird is the most rare. The eyes in this case are pink or red, because blood shows through in the absence of pigment in the irises. The beak, legs, and feet are very pale or white. Albino adults are rare in the wild because their eyesight is poor resulting in greater risk of predation. They are likely easier targets for predators because their colour distinguishes them from their environment. Falconers have observed that their trained birds are likely to attack a white pigeon in a flock because it is conspicuous. A complete albino often has weak eyesight and brittle wing and tail feathers, which may reduce its ability to fly. In flocks, albinos are often harassed by their own species. Such observations have been made among red-winged blackbirds, barn swallows, and African penguins. In a nesting colony of the latter, three unusual juveniles—one black-headed, one white-headed, and one full albino—were shunned and abused by companions.

Albinism has been reported in all orders and in 54 families of North American birds. The American robin and house sparrow led bird species in the incidence of albinism. Albinistic white appears to replace brown pigments more often than red or yellow ones; records suggest a greater incidence in crows, ravens, and hawks than in goldfinches or orioles.

Several kinds of albinism in chickens has been described: A complete albinism controlled by an autosomal recessive gene and two different kinds of partial albinism. One of the partial albinisms is sex-linked and the other is autosomal recessive. A fourth kind of albinism severely reduce pigmentation in the eyes, but only dilutes the pigment in the plumage.

Abnormally white feathers are not always due to albinism. Injury or disease may change their color, including dietary deficiencies or circulatory problems during feather development. Aging may also turn a bird's feathers white.

=== Hen feathering in cocks ===
Hen feathering in cocks is an inherited genetically conditioned plumage character in domestic fowl (domesticated Gallus gallus) controlled by a single gene. Males with this condition develop a female-type plumage, although otherwise look and respond like virile males. In some breeds, one can see males that have a plumage completely similar in all aspects to that of females. The trait is controlled by a simple autosomic dominant gene, whose expression is limited to the male sex. The condition is due to an enhanced activity of the aromatase complex of enzymes responsible for estrogen synthesis, with estrogen formation in the skin is as much as several hundred-fold higher than that of normal chickens.

=== Abnormal pigmentation conditions ===
- Albinism, the lack of melanin pigmentation
- Leucism, a condition similar to albinism in animals, characterized by reduced pigmentation in general
- Melanism (or melanosis), unusually dark melanin pigmentation
- Xanthochromism, unusually yellow pigmentation
- Ino budgerigar mutation, the occurrence of this mutation in captive-bred budgerigars
- Axanthism, lack of yellow pigmentation

== See also ==
- Animal coloration
- Hen feathering
- Imping
- Pluma porgy
- Plume hunting
- Sea pen
- Vermiculation

== Notes ==
^{a} Males of the white-shouldered and emperor fairywrens of New Guinea do not enter an eclipse plumage.
