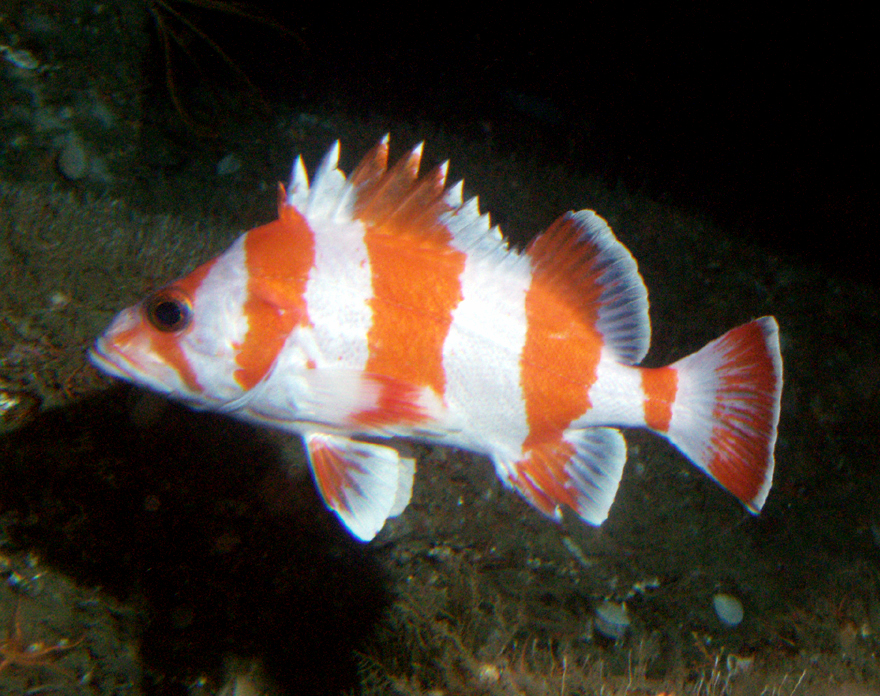

Scientific classification
- Kingdom: Animalia
- Phylum: Chordata
- Class: Actinopterygii
- Division: Teleostei
- Order: Perciformes
- Family: Scorpaenidae
- Genus: Sebastes
- Species: S. rubrivinctus

Binomial name
- Sebastes rubrivinctus (Jordan & Gilbert, 1880)

Synonyms
- Sebastichthys rubrivinctus Jordan & Gilbert, 1880; Sebastodes rubrivinctus (Jordan & Gilbert, 1880)

= Sebastes rubrivinctus =

Species of fish

Sebastes rubrivinctus, also known as the flag rockfish, Spanish flag, redbanded rockfish or barberpole, is a species of marine ray-finned fish belonging to the subfamily Sebastinae, the rockfishes, part of the family Scorpaenidae. It is found in the Eastern Pacific.

== Taxonomy ==
Sebestes rubrivinctus was first formally described as Sebastichthys rubrivinctus in 1880 by the American ichthyologists David Starr Jordan and Charles Henry Gilbert with the type locality given as a reef in Santa Barbara Channel and Monterey, California. Some authorities place this species in the subgenus Hispaniscus, of which it is the type species. The specific name rubrivinctus means "red banded" a reference to the bright red vertical bands which characterise this species.

== Distribution and habitat ==
Sebastes rubrivinctus is found in the eastern Pacific Ocean from Cedros Island in Baja California north to Alaska where it occurs as far west as Amchitka Island. The flag rockfish is a demersal fish which is found on rocky reefs down to 302 m (991 ft).

== Description ==
At the Monterey Bay Aquarium

Sebastes rubrivinctus has a relatively slender rhombus-shaped body which has a depth of roughly one third of its standard length with a thin, pointed head. There are 13 spines and 12 to 15 soft rays in the dorsal fin while the anal fin has 3 spines, the second spine being more robust and elongated than the third, and 6 to 8 soft rays. The caudal fin is truncate. The overall colour is white with 4 vermilion bands on the body and 2 on the head. The band at the front of the dorsal fin reaches onto the operculum. The bands fade and the white background colour becomes less bright as the fish ages. This species attains a maximum total length of 51 cm (20 in) and has a maximum published weight of 1.5 kg (3.3 lb).

== Biology ==
Sebastes rubrivinctus is typically encountered as a solitary fish but may occur in mixed aggregations with canary rockfish (S. pinniger), greenspotted rockfish (S. chlorostictus), rosy rockfish (S. rosaceus), squarespot rockfish (S.hopkinsi), starry rockfish (S. constellatus), and vermilion rockfish (S. miniatus). They are predatory and their diet includes fish, krill, octopus as well as a variety of other marine invertebrates. They live for at least 38 years. Like other rockfishes, the flag rockfish is ovoviviparous, the eggs are fertlised internally and the embryos are fed from the mother before she extrudes the live larvae.

== Fisheries ==
Sebastes rubrivinctus is of minor importance to recreational and commercial fisheries off california and most are caught by recreational fishermen using hook-and-line gear. It has been caught commercially off British Columbia with 45,000 kg (99,000 lb) landed in 1952.
