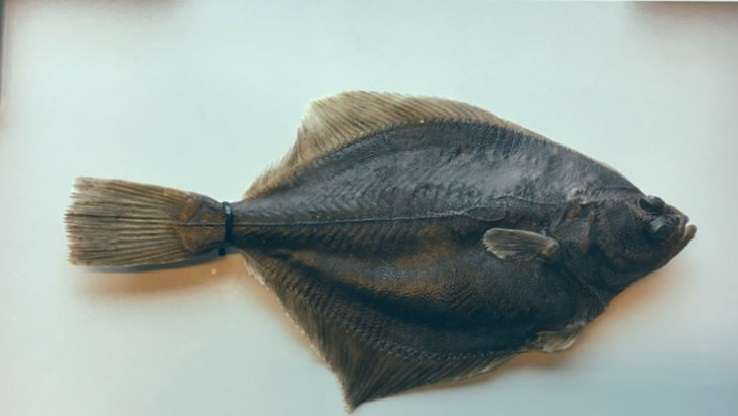

Scientific classification
- Kingdom: Animalia
- Phylum: Chordata
- Class: Actinopterygii
- Division: Teleostei
- Order: Carangiformes
- Suborder: Pleuronectoidei
- Family: Pleuronectidae
- Genus: Platichthys
- Species: P. solemdali

Binomial name
- Platichthys solemdali Momigliano, Denys, Jokinen and Merilä, 2018

= Baltic flounder =

Species of fish

The Baltic flounder (Platichthys solemdali) is a species of flatfish endemic to the Baltic Sea, where it is the only known endemic fish species.

It is sympatric with the closely related European flounder (P. flesus), which it looks identical to and can only be distinguished from via genetic analysis. However, both have very different spawning behaviors and habitat requirements; the strongly migratory European flounder requires a minimum level of salinity and spawns in the pelagic zone where its eggs are carried by the waves, whereas the largely resident Baltic flounder is more tolerant of salinity decreases and spawns in shallow neritic areas where its eggs sink to the seabed. Due to these different spawning behaviors, both species display a major degree of reproductive isolation, preventing them from intermixing and establishing them as different species.

Analyses indicate that the Baltic flounder and the Baltic population of the widespread European flounder both derive from the same ancestral population, but invaded the Baltic Sea at different times, with the ancestors of the Baltic flounder invading the area and diverging from the European flounder shortly after the Baltic Sea had formed from Ancylus Lake (circa 8,000 years ago), while the widespread European flounder invaded the area about 1,500 to 3,500 years later (or circa 5,000 - 6,500 years ago). The Baltic flounder has been steadily outcompeting the Baltic population of the European flounder over the past 5,000 years due to the declining level of salinity in the water; in areas such as the Gulf of Finland, the European flounder has almost completely disappeared due to climate change and eutrophication impacting its closest breeding grounds, leaving the Baltic flounder the predominant species in the area.
