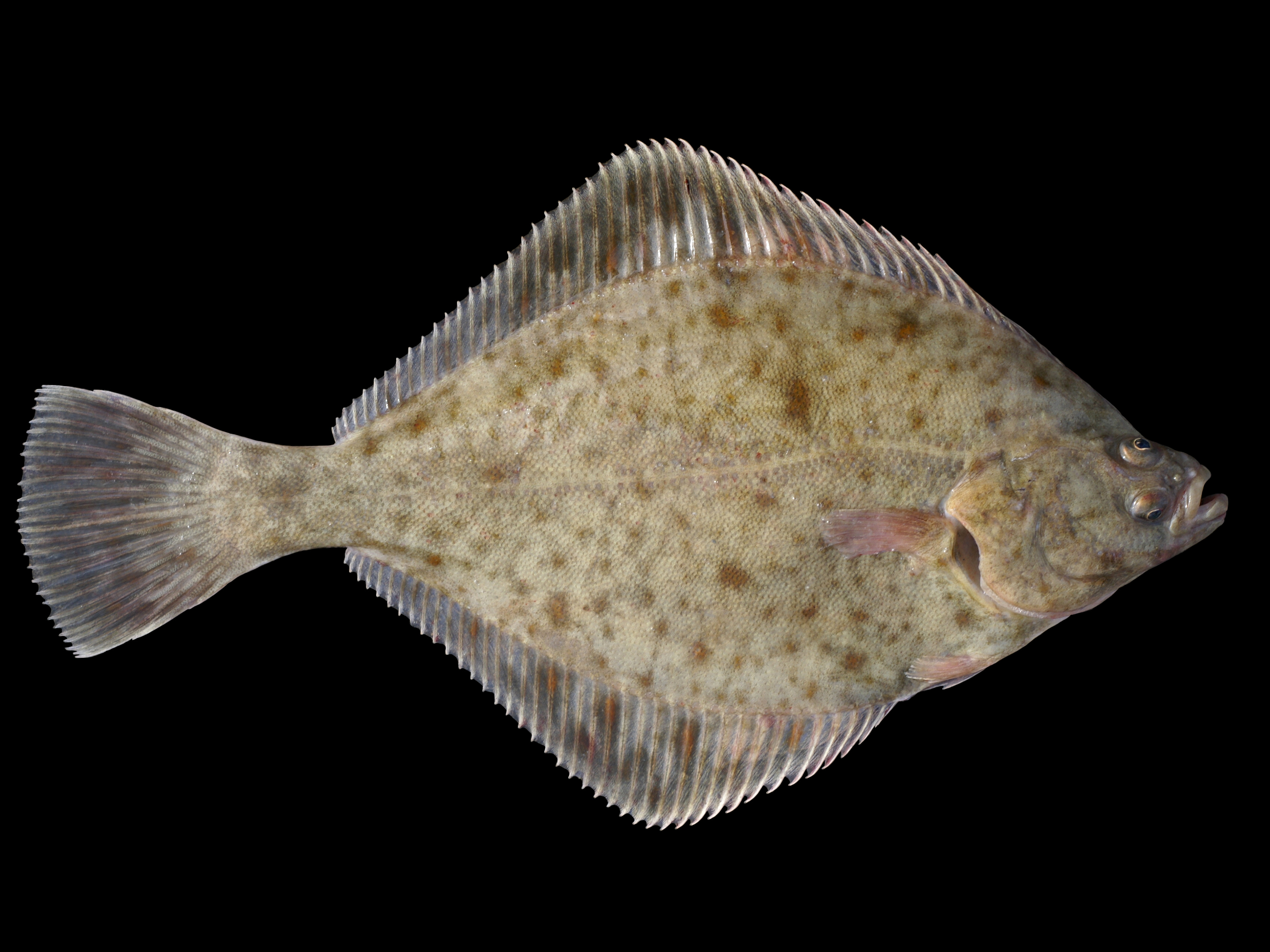

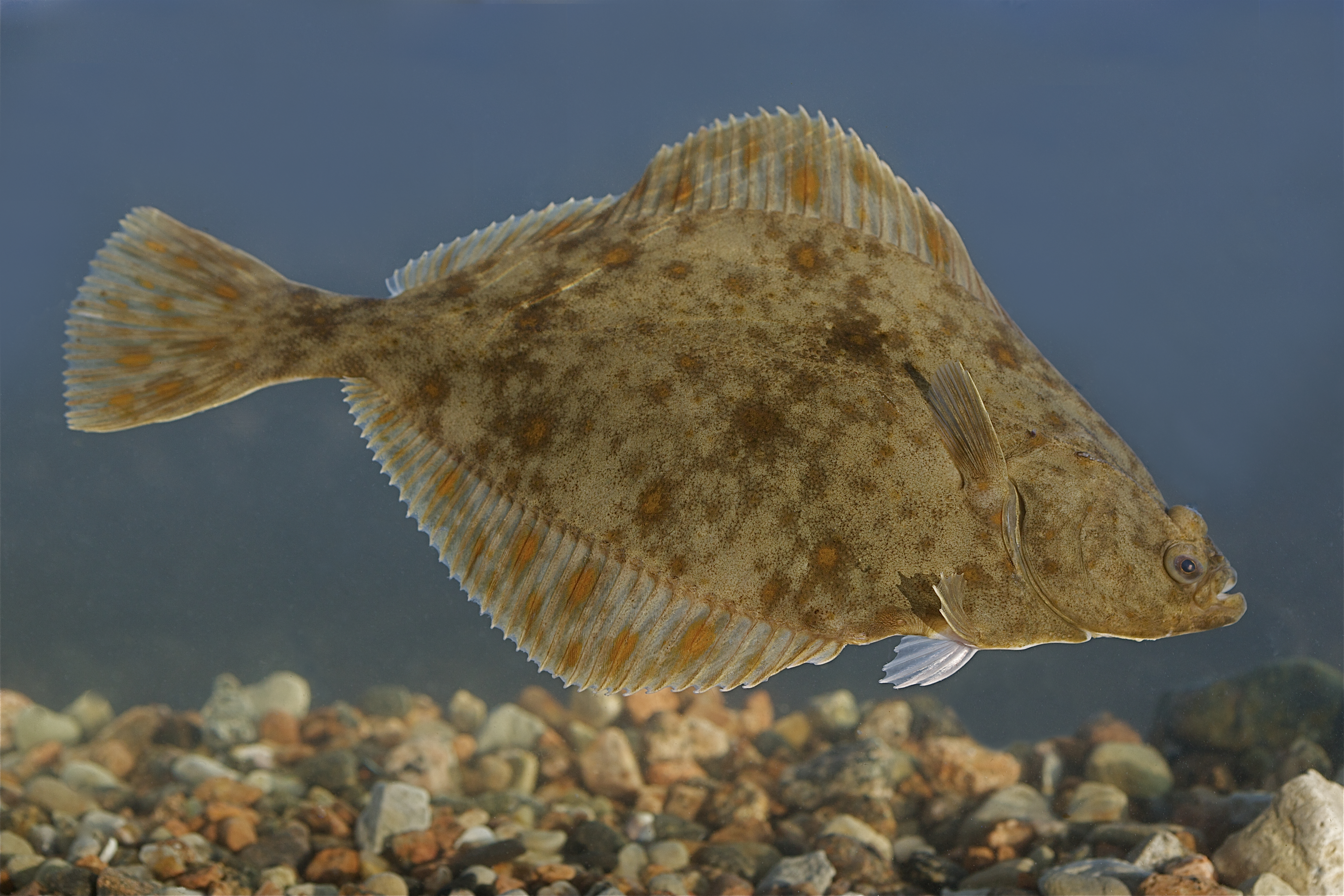

Conservation status
- Least Concern (IUCN 3.1)

Scientific classification
- Kingdom: Animalia
- Phylum: Chordata
- Class: Actinopterygii
- Division: Teleostei
- Order: Carangiformes
- Suborder: Pleuronectoidei
- Family: Pleuronectidae
- Genus: Platichthys
- Species: P. flesus

Binomial name
- Platichthys flesus (Linnaeus, 1758)

Synonyms
- Flesus vulgaris, (Moreau, 1881); Platessa carnaria, (Brown, 1830); Platessa glabra, (Rathke, 1837); Pleuronectes bogdanovii, (Sandeberg, 1878); Pleuronectes flesoides, (Pontoppidan, 1766); Pleuronectes flesus, (Linnaeus, 1758); Pleuronectes italicus, (Günther, 1862); Pleuronectes luscus, (Pallas, 1814); Pleuronectes passer, (Linnaeus, 1758); Pleuronectes roseus, (Shaw, 1796)

= European flounder =

Species of fish

The European flounder (Platichthys flesus) is a flatfish of European coastal waters from the White Sea in the north to the Mediterranean and the Black Sea in the south. It has been introduced into the United States and Canada accidentally through transport in ballast water. It is caught and used for human consumption.

The European flounder is oval in shape and is usually right-eyed. It normally grows about 30 cm in length, although lengths of up to 60 cm have been recorded. The upper surface is usually dull brown or olive in colour with reddish spots and brown blotches and this fish can change colour to suit its background, providing an effective camouflage. The underside is pearly-white, giving the fish one of its common names, the white fluke. The lateral line features rows of small tubercles, as do the bases of the dorsal and anal fins.

== Description ==
The European flounder is a flatfish with an oval-shaped body with a width about half its length. The maximum recorded length is 60 centimetres (24 in) and the maximum recorded weight 2.93 kilograms (6.5 lb). However, a more usual mature length is about 50 centimetres (20 in).

The fish is flattened laterally and swims and rests on one side. During development, its eyes usually migrate to the right side of the fish and what appears to be its upper surface is in reality its right side. In about thirty percent of individuals, its eyes move to the left and the left side becomes uppermost. The fish has a small mouth at the end of its bluntly pointed snout. The upper surface is fawn, olive green or pale brown with spots and larger patches of darker brown and some irregular reddish spots. The under surface is opaque pearly-white giving the fish its common name of "white fluke". The lateral line is nearly straight and runs along the middle of the upper surface, curving round the short pectoral fins. The dorsal fin runs from the base of the head to beside the caudal peduncle. It has no dorsal spines but has between 53 and 62 soft rays. The anal fin also runs the length of the body and has no spines and 37 to 46 soft rays. The skin is rough, with prickly tubercles at the base of the dorsal and anal fins, and there are large scales beside the lateral line. The caudal peduncle is about half the length of the tail and the caudal fin has a squared-off end.

== Distribution and habitat ==
The European flounder is native to the north eastern Atlantic Ocean and the Mediterranean Sea. The range extends from the Barents Sea, White Sea and Baltic Sea to Greece, Turkey, the Black Sea and the North African coast. It has been introduced into Iran and has become established off the eastern coast of Canada and the United States, possibly getting there by way of ballast water. It is normally found from the low shore down to depths of about 100 metres (330 ft) on sandy, shingle or muddy bottoms where its dappled colouring camouflage it and make it difficult to detect.

The European flounder can also be found in estuaries where it is tolerant of low salinity levels and, unlike other species of Pleuronectidae, it often spends part of its life cycle in freshwater and regularly makes its way into rivers. In the British Isles, it has been found as far inland as Montgomeryshire on the River Severn, Dinas Mawddwy on the River Dovey and Garstang on the River Wyre. Unlike the Atlantic salmon, it feeds in the rivers and makes its way out to sea again before spawning.

== Biology ==
European flounder, like other flatfish, experience an eye migration during their lifetime.

The European flounder lives and feeds on the seabed and in the waters immediately above. It is mainly nocturnal and during the day rests on the sea floor, semi-submerging itself in the substrate. It feeds on bivalve molluscs and other benthic invertebrates such as shrimps, polychaete worms, gastropod molluscs and small fish.

The European flounder leaves freshwater in the autumn and can often be caught in estuaries when the first frosts occur. Then the fish move into deeper water for the winter. In the spring it migrates to the spawning grounds, travelling at three to four miles (five to seven kilometres) per day and not eating en route. Spawning takes place from January to perhaps as late as July, being later in more northerly latitudes. The female releases about a million eggs which are lighter than water. The male releases sperm which also floats and both eggs and sperm rise to the surface. Here the eggs are fertilised and hatch after six to eleven days depending on the water temperature. The developing larvae are planktonic and drift towards the coast and use selective tidal stream transport to migrate into estuaries and rivers. Juvenile flounders live in shallow waters, estuaries and rivers commonly at low salinity conditions. Flounders become mature when still small, the males when they measure 11.5 centimetres (4.5 in) and the females when they measure 18 cm (7 in). The European flounder sometimes hybridises with European plaice (Pleuronectes platessa) and, particularly in the western Baltic Sea, the hybrid is common. In the Baltic Sea, populations of European flounder are known to breed in shallow waters rather than the deep water typical of the species; these populations are now known to be a distinct species, the Baltic flounder (P. solemdali). The Baltic flounder has steadily outcompeted the European flounder over the past 5,000 years due to a combination of natural and anthropogenic environmental changes.

== Human interactions ==
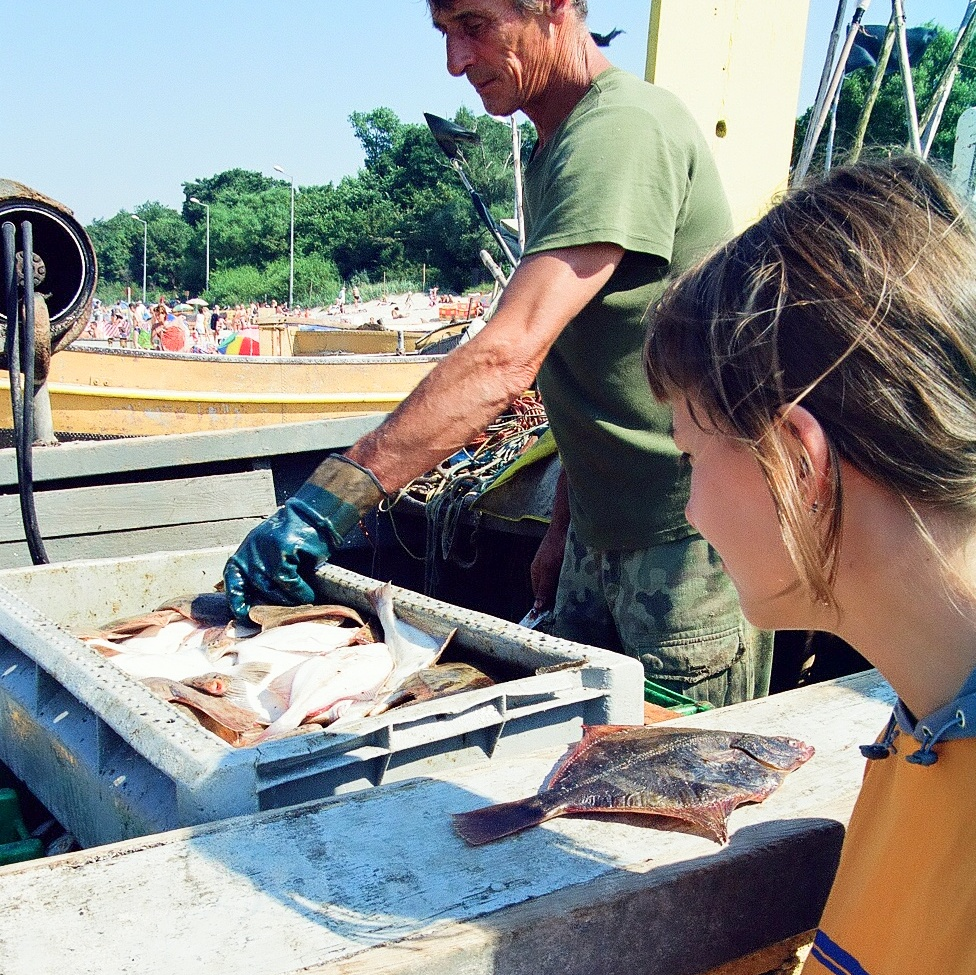

The European flounder is used for human consumption but is not so highly esteemed as the European plaice or common sole (Solea solea). The most important fisheries are in the Baltic Sea and the waters around the Netherlands and Denmark. In 2010, the total world catch was about nineteen thousand tonnes, mostly caught by bottom trawling. The fish is marketed fresh and frozen and can be fried, boiled, steamed, baked or microwaved.

It has been found that male European flounders living in polluted estuaries may show signs of excess exposure to oestrogens. Substances such as vitellogenins have been identified in their blood at between four and six times the concentration found in the blood of fish from uncontaminated areas; however, the flounder is less sensitive to oestrogens than is the freshwater rainbow trout.

Occasional records of the European flounder (Platichthys flesus) have been documented in freshwater reservoirs of the Volga River, hundreds of kilometers from the sea. The most probable invasion vector is the transport of larvae from the Baltic or White Seas in the ballast water of "river-sea" class vessels. Due to the absence of suitable spawning conditions, the species has not established self-sustaining populations in the basin.

== Status ==
The European flounder is assessed by the IUCN in their Red List of Threatened Species as being of "Least Concern". This is because it has a large population size and extensive range, and is common in nearly all parts of its range. Numbers of fish may be decreasing somewhat but not to the extent that would warrant listing it under a higher risk category. However, in portions of the Baltic Sea, changes in the environment have resulted in steadily receding breeding grounds for the European flounder; in some places such as the Gulf of Finland, the European flounder has been nearly completely extirpated, leaving the Baltic flounder as the predominant species.
