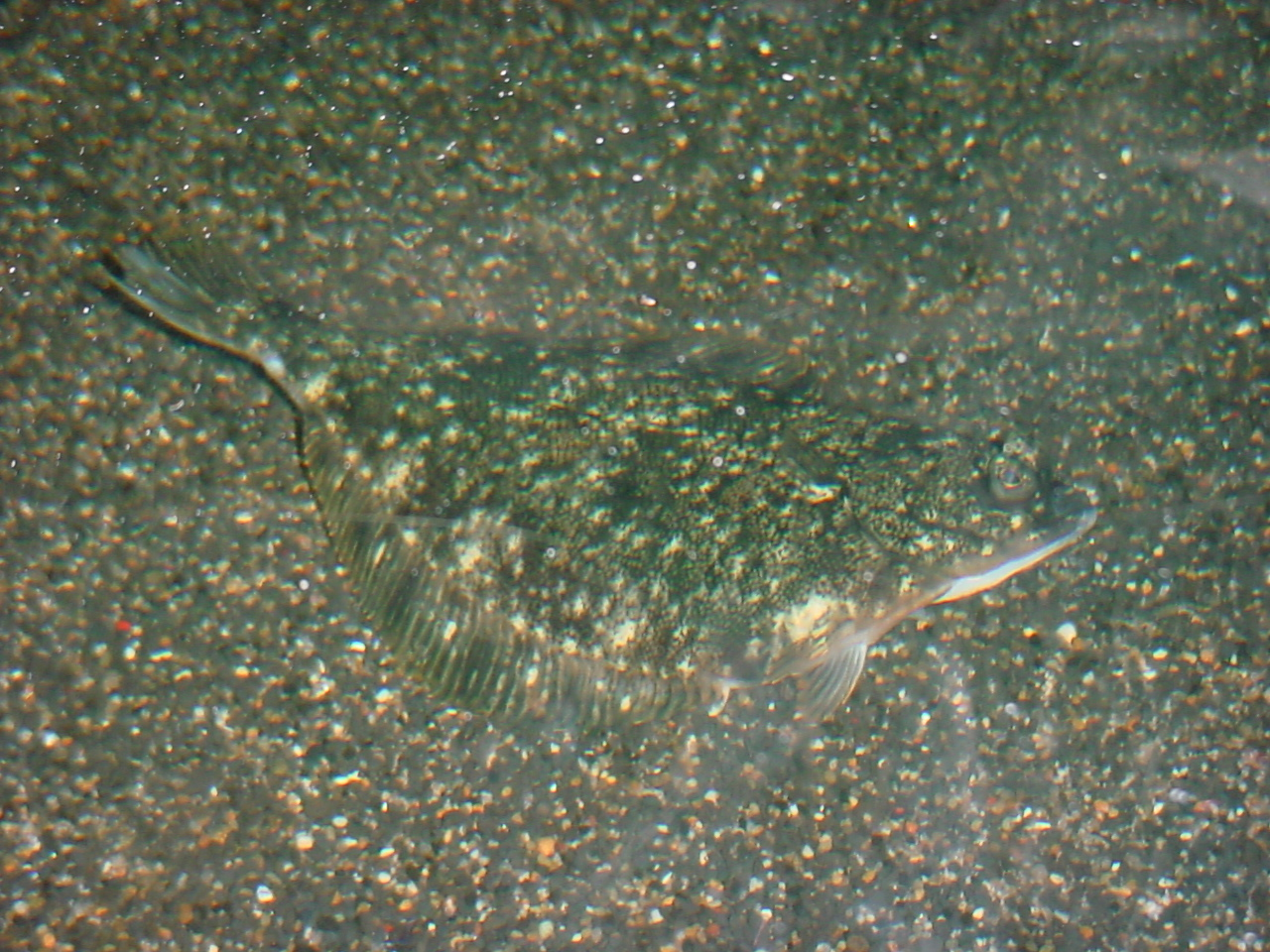

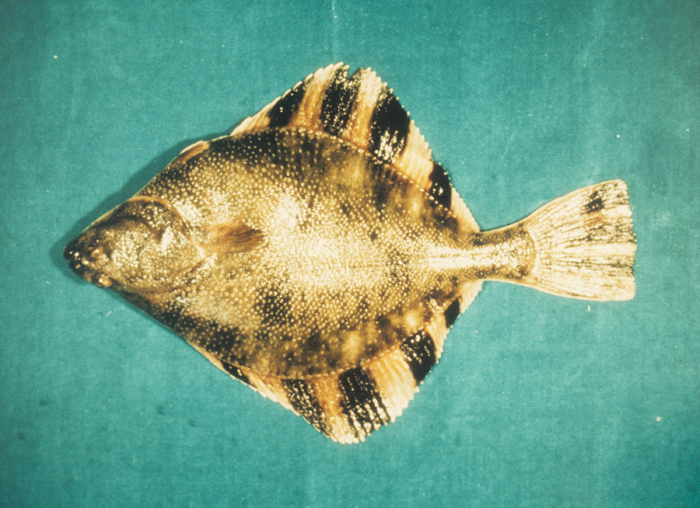

Conservation status
- Least Concern (IUCN 3.1)

Scientific classification
- Kingdom: Animalia
- Phylum: Chordata
- Class: Actinopterygii
- Division: Teleostei
- Order: Carangiformes
- Suborder: Pleuronectoidei
- Family: Pleuronectidae
- Genus: Platichthys
- Species: P. stellatus

Binomial name
- Platichthys stellatus (Pallas, 1787)

Synonyms
- Platichthys rugosus (Girard, 1854); Platichthys stellatus (Pallas, 1787)

= Starry flounder =

Species of fish

The starry flounder (Platichthys stellatus), also known as the grindstone, emery wheel and long-nosed flounder, is a common flatfish found around the margins of the North Pacific.

The distinctive features of the starry flounder include the combination of black and white-to-orange bar on the dorsal and anal fins, as well as the skin covered with scales modified into tiny star-shaped plates or tubercles (thus both the common name and species epithet), resulting in a rough feel. The eyed side is black to dark brown, while the lower side is white or cream-colored. Although classed as "righteye flounders," individuals may have their eyes on either the right or left side. They have been recorded at up to 91 cm and 9 kg.

Starry flounders are inshore fish, ranging up estuaries well into the freshwater zone, to the first riffles, with young found as much as 120 km inland. In marine environments, they occur as deep as 375 m. They glide over the bottom by rippling their dorsal and anal fins, feeding on a variety of benthic invertebrates. Larvae start out consuming planktonic algae and crustaceans, then as they metamorphose they shift to larger prey.

Like all flounders, when they are young, starry flounders swim around like normal fish in a vertical position, but soon they begin to tilt to one side as they swim and eventually live lying on the sandy floor. As well as many other changes in body structure, the migration of one of the eyes to the other side of the head is one of the most crucial changes. Other changes include the loss of dark color on the under side.

On the western side of the Pacific they occur as far south as Japan and Korea, ranging through the Aleutian Islands, the coast of Alaska, Canada, and down the West Coast of the U.S. as far as the mouth of the Santa Ynez River in Santa Barbara County, California. They are an important game and food fish across their range.

== Morphology ==
The starry flounder has an oval shaped body with a slender, pointed head. Its eyed side is an olive to dark brown or almost black in some cases and the blind side is a white or creamy white color. This species has unpaired fins ranging from a white to yellow-orange complexion, with black bands running perpendicular to the fish. The posterior fin or caudal fin is slightly rounded. Lateral lines with a slight curve run over the pectoral fin and a complete lack of an accessory dorsal branch is found within this species. This species relies heavily on its strong anal spine for swimming. This anal spine is used as the primary driver of locomotion while the fish is swimming through the open ocean. Through an up and down motion the fish achieves a propelling effect.

== Behavior and life history ==
=== Behavior ===
The starry flounder has a multitude of well studied behaviors that are exhibited on a daily basis. At a normal resting position the dorsal and anal fins are angled so to prevent the body from resting upon the substrate, support being given by the fins, so as to create a cushion of water between the fish and the substrate. This is also for water to escape through an opening on the blind side, gill slit, of the fish and lessens the amount of effort needed to move.

Movement of this fish has been described to look much like crawling, with the first few rays of the dorsal and anal fins moving in a rowing motion that progresses caudally along the fish creating a waving movement of the fins, propelling the fish forward. Flounders are also capable of backwards locomotion, which is achieved with the same waving movement of the fins but the rowing motion progresses anteriorly. This movement is used as a method of escape or if it encounters an obstacle. When quick movements are needed from this fish, such as when feeding or frightened, the pectoral fin is extended at a right angle from the body, and used as an additional paddle.

Another key behavioral ability displayed by the P. stellatus is its ability to change its body coloration depending upon the substrate or environment that it is in. This process is done by changing pigment granule concentration in chromatophores, which will the result in the shade variations seen within this species.

== Ecology ==
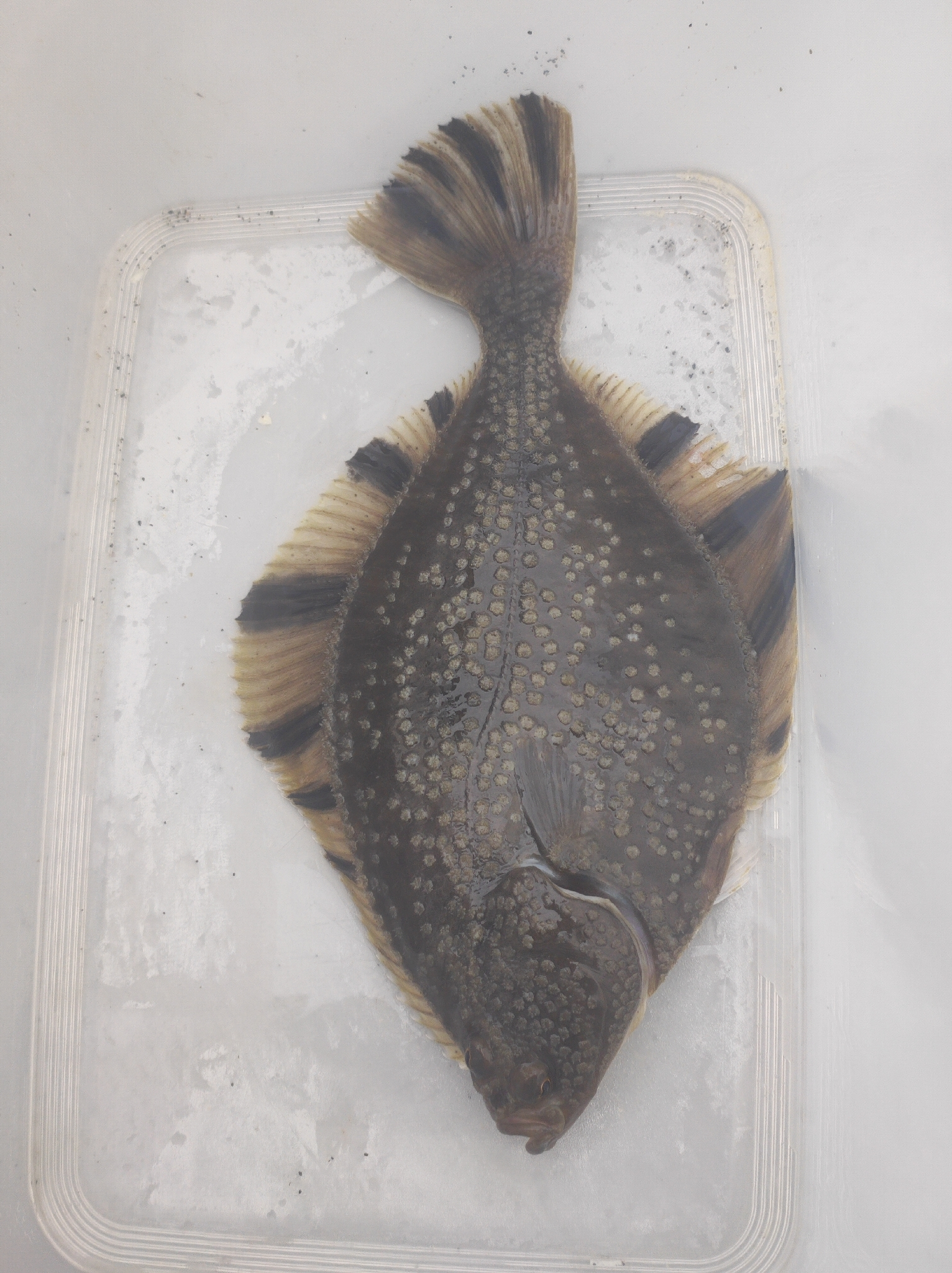
From the Sea of Ohkotsk

The primary habitat for this species is within mud, sand, or gravel bottoms from 0–375 m (1230 ft), but most commonly above 146 m (479 ft). They are usually found near shore and often enter brackish or even fresh water on occasion. Highly salinated water is something this fish stays away from because of its inability to keep its cells from becoming hypersalinated.

=== Diet ===
The starry flounder before metamorphosis is dependent upon planktonic organisms as a food source during its younger stage of life. Feeding is usually done by waiting for the prey to settle to the floor or around eye level of the flounder and then make a quick lunge at the food drawing a mouthful of water also to help pull the prey in. As the fish develops more, they are able to feed upon small clams, some larger fish, invertebrates and also worms. When the starry flounder reaches adulthood the primary stomach contents that has been found are clams. Clams that are too large for ingestion often have their siphons eaten.

=== Distribution ===
The starry flounder has a relatively large home range, going from the North Pacific Ocean all the way to Southern California. Within the Pacific Ocean they are located in Korea and Southern Japan through Bering Strait and Arctic Alaska to the Coronation Gulf. They have also been prominently found in Canada, Santa Barbara and Southern California.

== Interactions with humans ==
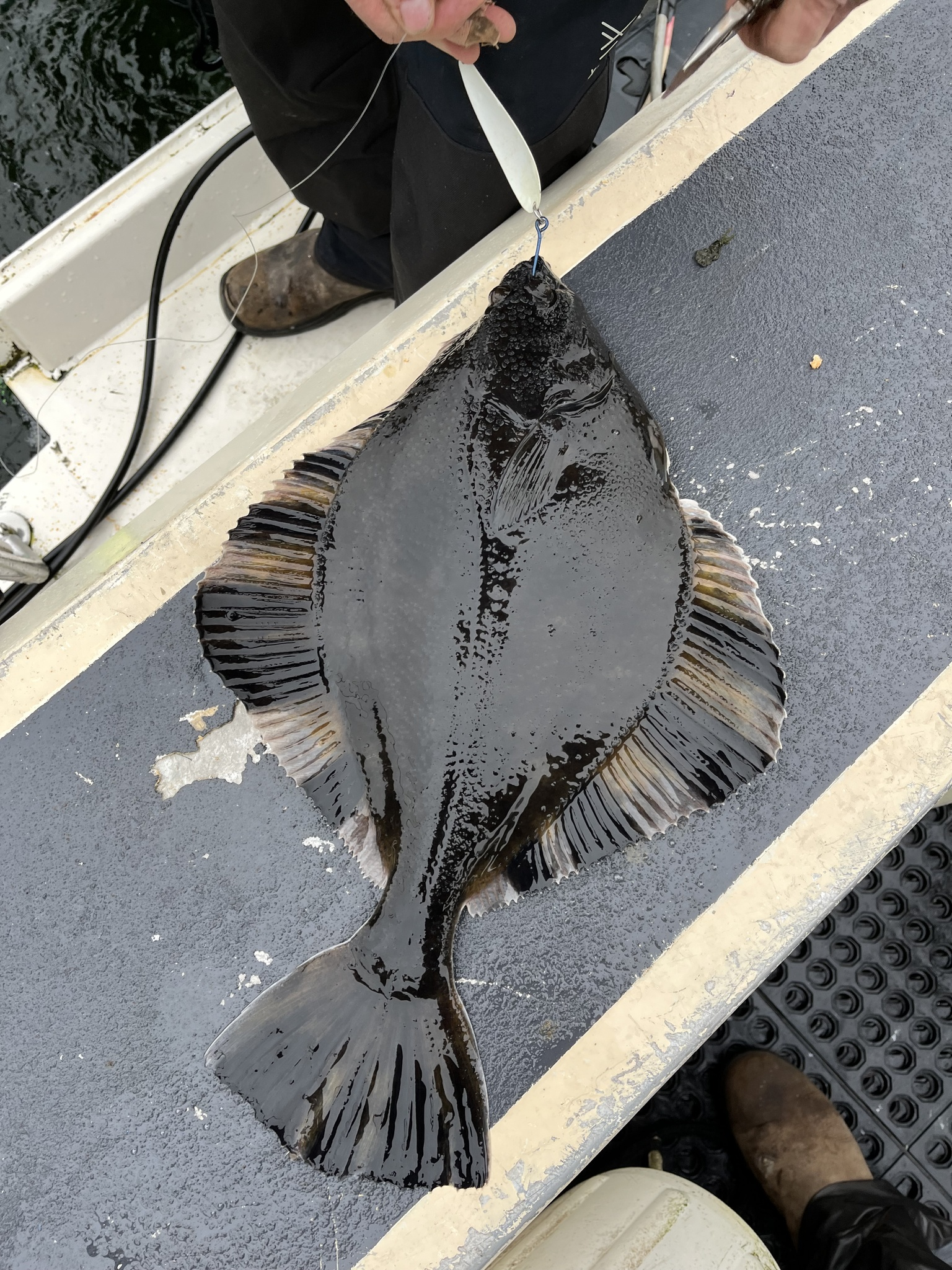
In British Columbia, Canada

=== Commercial fishing ===
In California the P. stellatus is of relatively minor importance within fisheries, only entering commercial catch at major fishing ports north of Point Conception. Usually filleted and often sold under the name of "sole." Not considered a very flavorful or texturely decent fish. The young and smaller individuals are more sought after than the larger and heavier fish. Within the Bering Sea it's caught and mainly canned as a high class export item.
