= Microstomus shuntovi =

Scientific classification
- Domain: Eukaryota
- Kingdom: Animalia
- Phylum: Chordata
- Class: Actinopterygii
- Order: Carangiformes
- Suborder: Pleuronectoidei
- Family: Pleuronectidae
- Genus: Microstomus
- Species: M. shuntovi

Binomial name
- Microstomus shuntovi Borets, 1983

Species of fish

Microstomus shuntovi is a flatfish of the family Pleuronectidae. It is a bathydemersal fish that lives on bottoms at depths of between 270 and 290 metres (890 and 950 ft). Its native habitat is the north Pacific.
