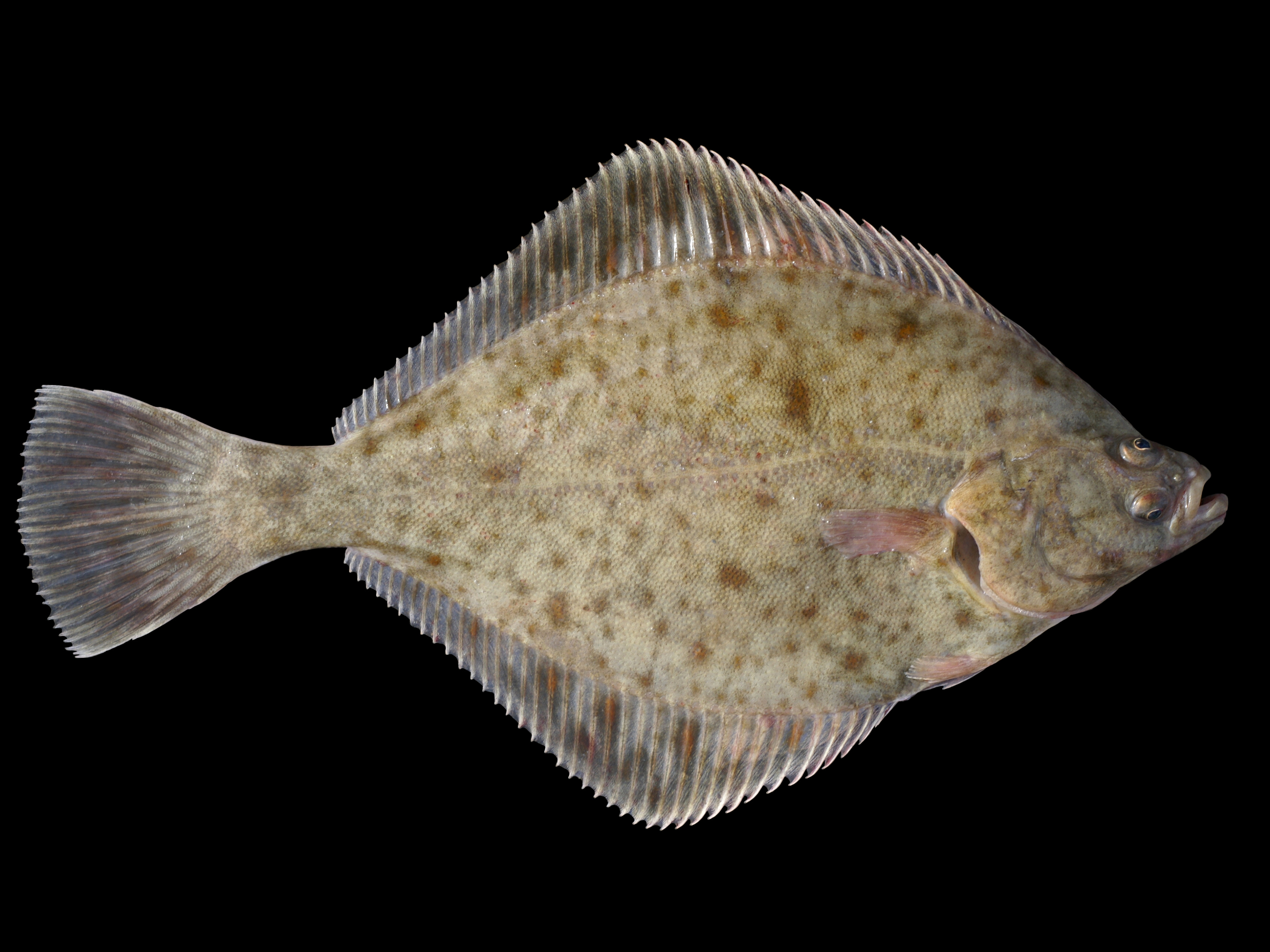
- European flounder (P. flesus)

Scientific classification
- Kingdom: Animalia
- Phylum: Chordata
- Class: Actinopterygii
- Order: Carangiformes
- Suborder: Pleuronectoidei
- Family: Pleuronectidae
- Subfamily: Pleuronectinae
- Genus: Platichthys; Girard, 1854

Type species
- Platichthys rugosus Girard, 1854

Synonyms
- Flesus Moreau, 1881; Kareius Jordan & Snyder, 1900; Pseudoplatichthys Hikita, 1934

= Platichthys =

Platichthys Temporal range: Middle Miocene–present

Genus of fishes

Platichthys is a genus of flatfish native to the North Pacific and North Atlantic oceans. Despite being in the family Pleuronectidae (popularly known as righteye flounders), all four species in the genus Platichthys are often "lefteyed", i.e. they lie on the sea bottom on their right side, with both eyes on the left side.

== Species ==
There are currently four recognized species in this genus:

Image	Scientific name	Common name	Distribution
	Platichthys bicoloratus (Basilewsky, 1855)	Stone flounder	Northwest Pacific from the East China Sea and the coastal waters of southern Japan
	Platichthys flesus (Linnaeus, 1758)	European flounder	European coastal waters from the White Sea in the north to the Mediterranean and the Black Sea in the south
	Platichthys stellatus (Pallas, 1788)	Starry flounder	North Pacific from the Yellow Sea along the Korean peninsula, Russian Far East, and the Japanese archipelago to the Arctic, extending south through the Bering Sea to California
	Platichthys solemdali Momigliano, Denys, Jokinen and Merilä, 2018	Baltic flounder	the Baltic Sea

A single fossil species is known in †Platichthys miostellatus Sakamoto & Uyeno, 1989 from the Middle Miocene of Japan.
