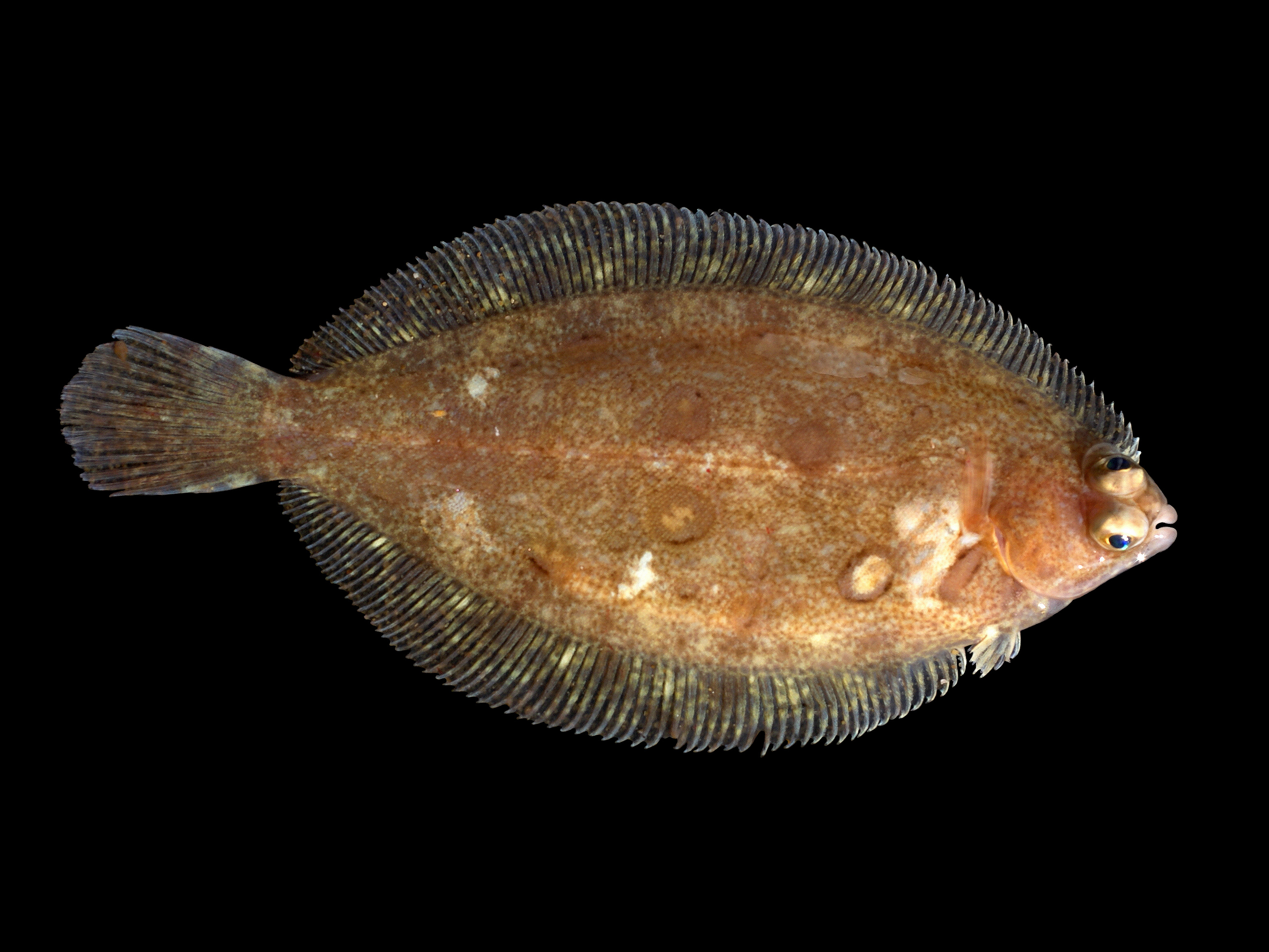
- Lemon sole Microstomus kitt

Scientific classification
- Kingdom: Animalia
- Phylum: Chordata
- Class: Actinopterygii
- Order: Carangiformes
- Suborder: Pleuronectoidei
- Family: Pleuronectidae
- Subfamily: Microstominae
- Genus: Microstomus; Gottsche, 1835

Type species
- Microstomus latidens Gottsche, 1835

= Microstomus =

Microstomus Temporal range: Middle Miocene–present

Genus of fishes

Microstomus is a genus of righteye flounders native to the northern Pacific and north-eastern Atlantic oceans.

== Etymology ==
The word Microstomus is derived from the Greek μικρὸς (mikros), meaning "small", and στόμα (stoma), meaning "mouth".

== Species ==
There are currently five recognized species in this genus:

- Microstomus achne (D. S. Jordan & Starks, 1904) (Slime flounder)
- Microstomus bathybius (Gilbert, 1890) (Deep-sea sole)
- Microstomus kitt (Walbaum, 1792) (Lemon sole)
- Microstomus pacificus (Lockington, 1879) (Pacific Dover sole)
- Microstomus shuntovi Borets, 1983

A single fossil species is known in †Microstomus tochigiensis Sakamoto & Uyeno, 1993 from the Middle Miocene of Japan.
