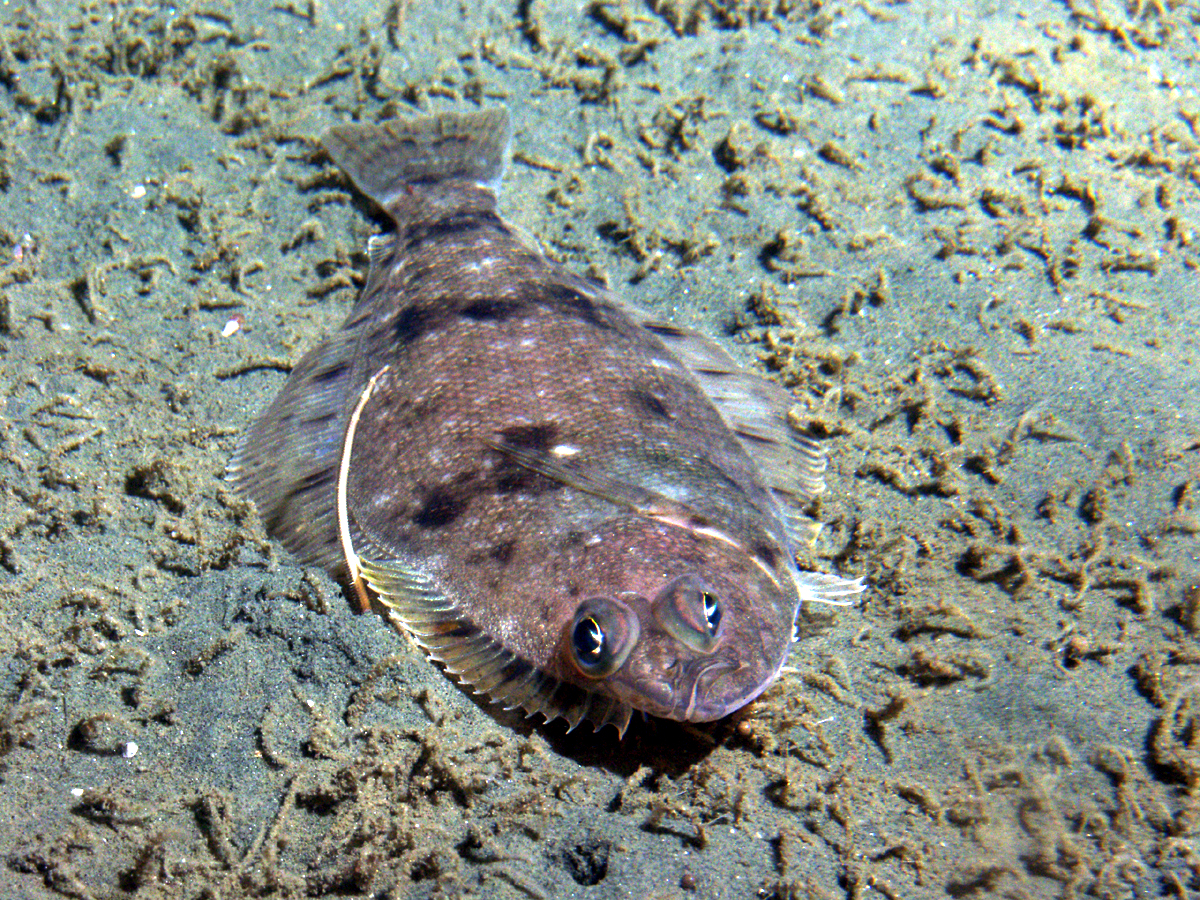

Conservation status
- Least Concern (IUCN 3.1)

Scientific classification
- Kingdom: Animalia
- Phylum: Chordata
- Class: Actinopterygii
- Order: Carangiformes
- Suborder: Pleuronectoidei
- Family: Pleuronectidae
- Genus: Microstomus
- Species: M. pacificus

Binomial name
- Microstomus pacificus (Lockington, 1879)

Synonyms
- Glyptocephalus pacificus Lockington, 1879

= Microstomus pacificus =

Species of flounder found in the North Pacific Ocean

The Pacific Dover sole (Microstomus pacificus), also called the slime sole or slippery sole, is a Pacific flatfish of the flounder family which ranges from Baja California to the Bering Sea. It takes its name from a resemblance to the common sole of Europe, which is often called Dover sole.

Pacific Dover sole can live for 45 years. The species was identified in proximity to a methane seep off the coast of Del Mar in Southern California. They spawn annually in the winter season in deep water between 800 metres (2,600 ft) and 1,000 metres (3,300 ft). Males begin to spawn at four years of age, while females begin to spawn at age five.

== Use as food ==
Pacific Dover sole is generally sold whole, in steaks, or in fillets. The skin is generally removed before cooking, as it is slimy. It is mild-tasting, with firm flesh, though "not as mild as European Dover sole". The Monterey Bay Aquarium Seafood Watch lists Pacific Dover Sole from California, US West Coast, and Alaska fisheries as "Best Choice", with fish from British Columbia listed as a "Good Alternative" due to concerns over bycatch of overfished and otherwise at-risk species.

== Nutrition ==
Nutrition information for Pacific Dover sole is as follows.

Serving Size	100g
=== Calories ===	64 kcal
=== Protein ===	14.5 g
Protein calories: 62 kcal Protein calories % : 96.6%	
=== Fat ===	0.2 g
Fat calories: 2 kcal Fat calories % : 3.4%	
=== Carbohydrate ===	0.0 g
Carbohydrate calories: 0 kcal Carbohydrate calories % : 0.0%	
Cholesterol	56.2 mg
Sodium	91.4 mg

Serving Size	per 100g	per 100 kcal
Omega 3 (EPA+DHA)	95 mg	148 mg
Vitamin B3	1.8 mg	2.8 mg
Vitamin B6	0.3 mg	0.5 mg
Vitamin B12	0.7 mcg	1.1 mcg
Vitamin D	<32 IU	<50 IU
Vitamin E	2 mg	3.1 mg
Calcium	9.2 mg	14.3 mg
Magnesium	16.1 mg	25.1 mg
Phosphorus	162 mg	252 mg
Potassium	322 mg	501 mg
Selenium	190 mcg	296 mcg
