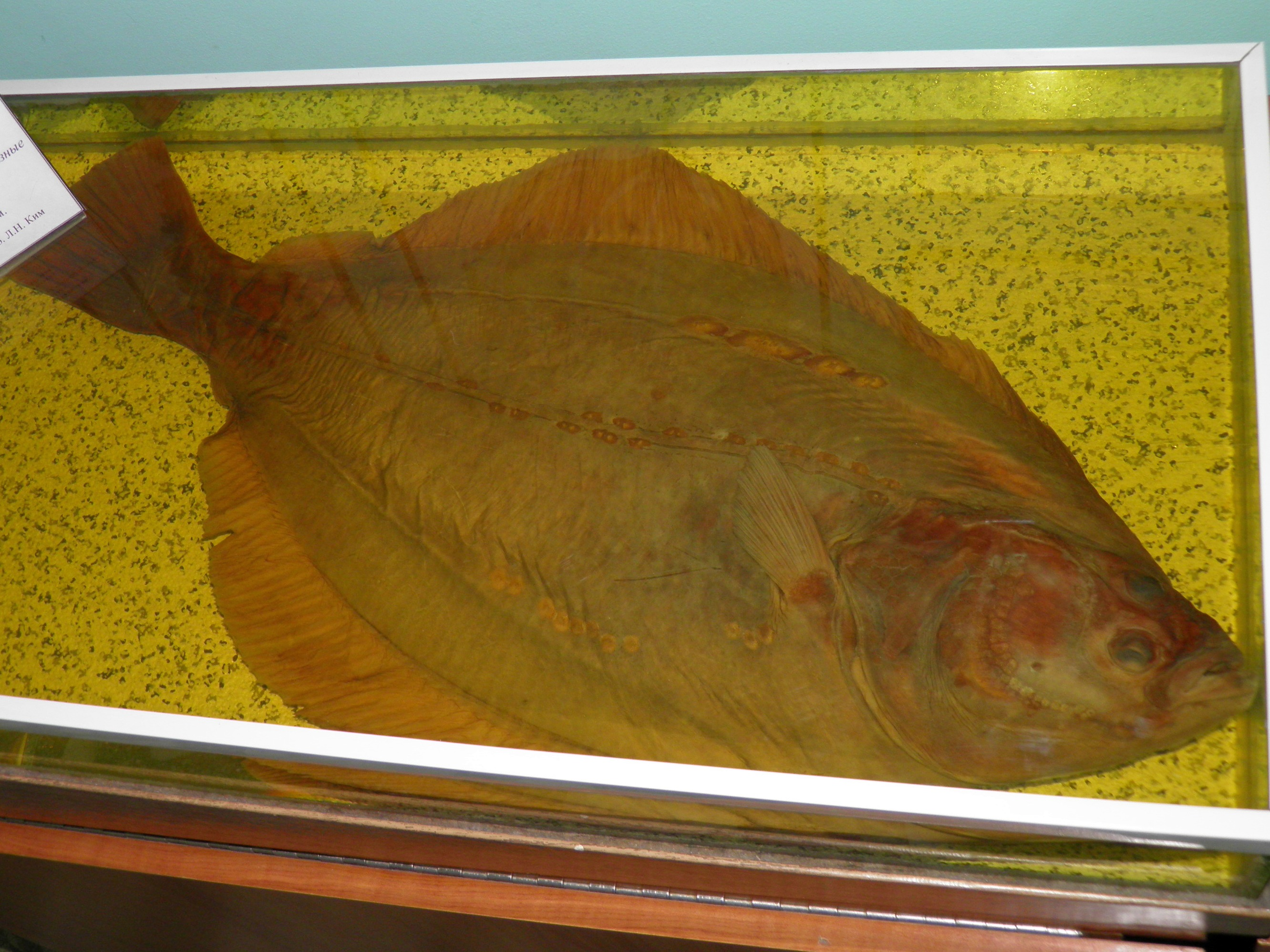

Conservation status
- Vulnerable (IUCN 3.1)

Scientific classification
- Kingdom: Animalia
- Phylum: Chordata
- Class: Actinopterygii
- Order: Carangiformes
- Suborder: Pleuronectoidei
- Family: Pleuronectidae
- Genus: Platichthys
- Species: P. bicoloratus

Binomial name
- Platichthys bicoloratus (Basilewsky, 1855)

Synonyms
- Platessa bicolorata Basilewsky, 1855; Kareius bicoloratus (Basilewsky, 1855); Pleuronectes scutifer Steindachner, 1870

= Stone flounder =

Species of fish

The stone flounder (Platichthys bicoloratus) is a species of flatfish in the family Pleuronectidae. It is a demersal fish that lives on sandy and muddy bottoms in coastal areas at depths of up to 150 metres (500 ft). Its native habitat is the temperate waters of the north-western Pacific, from Japan to the Kuril Islands, Sakhalin, Korea, northern China and Taiwan. It is oceanodromous and is found in salt, brackish and fresh waters. It can grow up to 50 centimetres (20 in) in length, and may reach 12 years of age. It was formerly classified in the now defunct genus Kareius.

== Genomics ==
A telomere-to-telomere gap-free genome assembly of Platichthys bicoloratus was published in 2026. The assembled genome spans approximately 587.8 Mb, with 98.58% of the sequence assigned to 24 chromosomes. The assembly has a BUSCO completeness score of 96.5%, and 22,312 protein-coding genes were predicted.

== Diet ==
The stone flounder's diet consists of zoobenthos organisms such as amphipods, bivalves, mysids and polychaetes.
