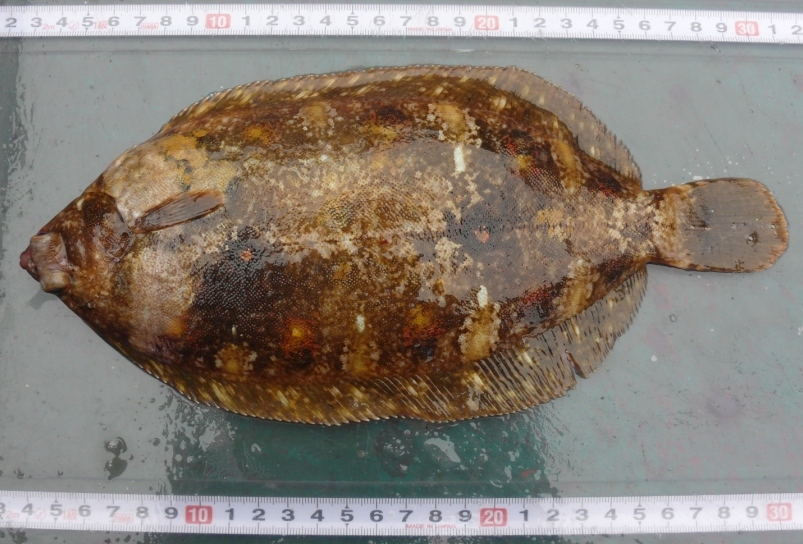

Scientific classification
- Domain: Eukaryota
- Kingdom: Animalia
- Phylum: Chordata
- Class: Actinopterygii
- Order: Carangiformes
- Suborder: Pleuronectoidei
- Family: Pleuronectidae
- Genus: Microstomus
- Species: M. achne

Binomial name
- Microstomus achne (Jordan & Starks, 1904)

Synonyms
- Veraequa achne Jordan & Starks, 1904

= Slime flounder =

Species of fish

The slime flounder (Microstomus achne) is a kind of flatfish from the family Pleuronectidae. It is a demersal fish that lives on sand and mud bottoms at depths of between 15 and 800 metres (49 and 2,625 ft), though it is most commonly found between 20 and 610 metres (66 and 2,001 ft). Its native habitat is the temperate waters of the northwest Pacific, from the East China Sea to the Yellow Sea and the Sea of Japan, as far as Sakhalin and the Kuril Islands. It reaches up to 60 centimetres (24 in) in length, and can weigh up to 1.76 kilograms (3.9 lb).

== Diet ==
The diet of the slime flounder consists mainly of zoobenthos organisms such as polychaetes and crabs.
