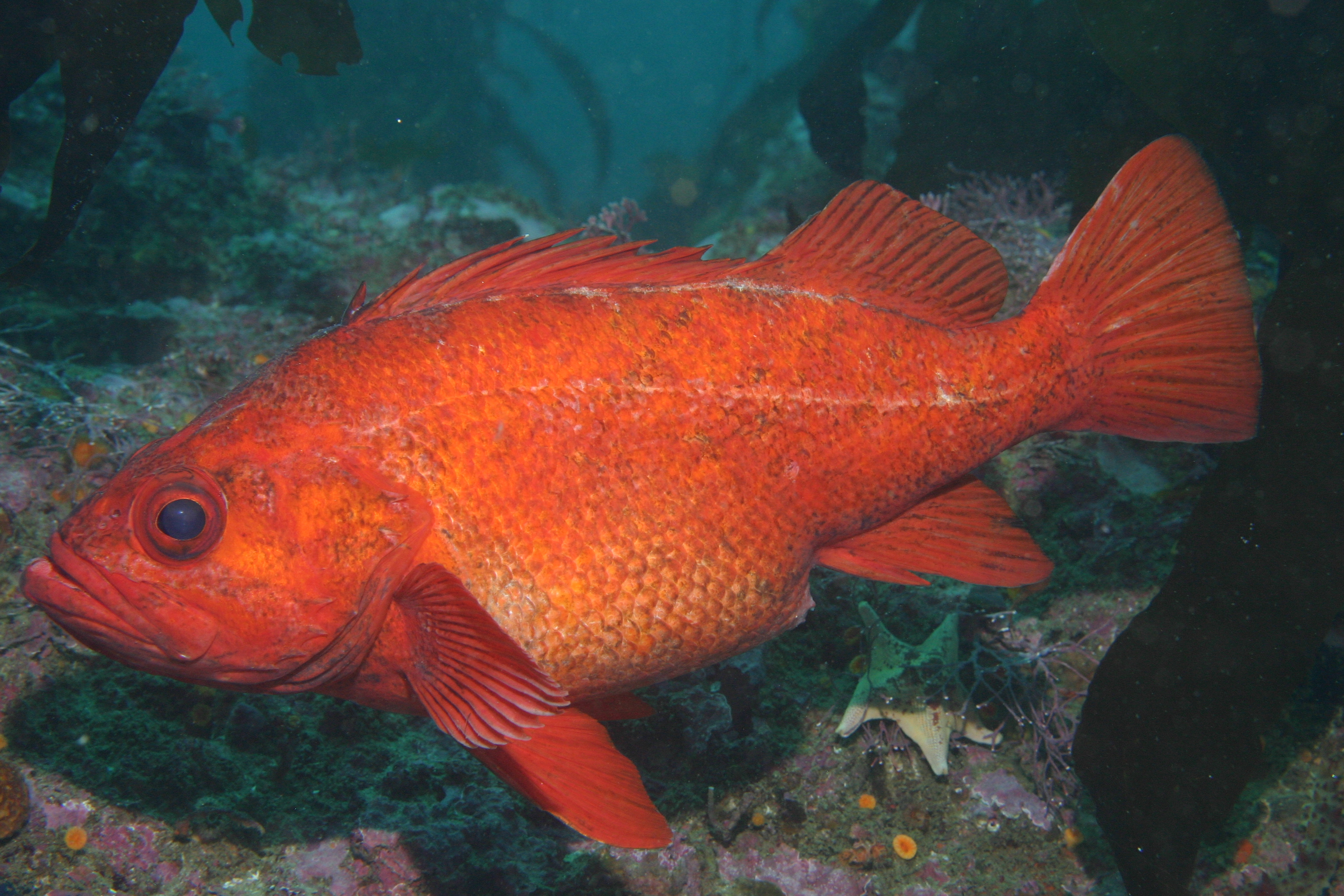
- Gravid female, in California

Scientific classification
- Kingdom: Animalia
- Phylum: Chordata
- Class: Actinopterygii
- Order: Perciformes
- Family: Scorpaenidae
- Genus: Sebastes
- Species: S. miniatus

Binomial name
- Sebastes miniatus (D. S. Jordan & C. H. Gilbert, 1880)

Synonyms
- Sebastichthys miniatus Jordan & Gilbert, 1880; Sebastodes miniatus (Jordan & Gilbert, 1880)

= Sebastes miniatus =

Species of fish

Sebastes miniatus, the vermilion rockfish, vermilion seaperch, red snapper, red rock cod, and rasher, is a species of marine ray-finned fish belonging to the subfamily Sebastinae, the rockfishes, part of the family Scorpaenidae. It is native to the waters of the Pacific Ocean off western North America from Baja California to Alaska.

== Taxonomy ==
Sebastes miniatus was first formally described in 1880 by the American ichthyologists David Starr Jordan and Charles Henry Gilbert with the type locality given as Santa Barbara and Monterey, California. Some authorities place this species in the subgenus Rosicola. The specific name miniatus means "bright red" or "scarlet" a reference to the color of the vermilion fins and body.

== Distribution and habitat ==
Sebastes miniatus occurs in the eastern Pacific from San Quintin, Baja California in Mexico north to Prince William Sound in Alaska. It is found in and around rocky reefs at depth from 6 to 250 m (20 to 820 ft).

== Description ==
Sebastes miniatus has a rather stocky body shape with the depth of the body being equivalent to just under two fifths of its standard length. It has moderately robust to weak spines on its head, the nasal, preocular, supraocular, postocular, tympanic and parietal spines being always present, the nuchal spine usually being absent and the coronal spine never being present. The dorsal fin is continuous with a deep notch separating the spiny and soft rayed parts with the spiny part has a longer base than the soft rayed part with deep incisions on the membranes between the spines. There are 13 spines and 13 to 15 soft rays in the dorsal fin while the anal fin has 3 spines and 7 soft rays. The lower jaw is rough with large scales. It has deep caudal peduncle and the caudal fin has a slight fork. This species attains a maximum total length of 91 cm (36 in) and a maximum published weight of 6.8 kg (15 lb).

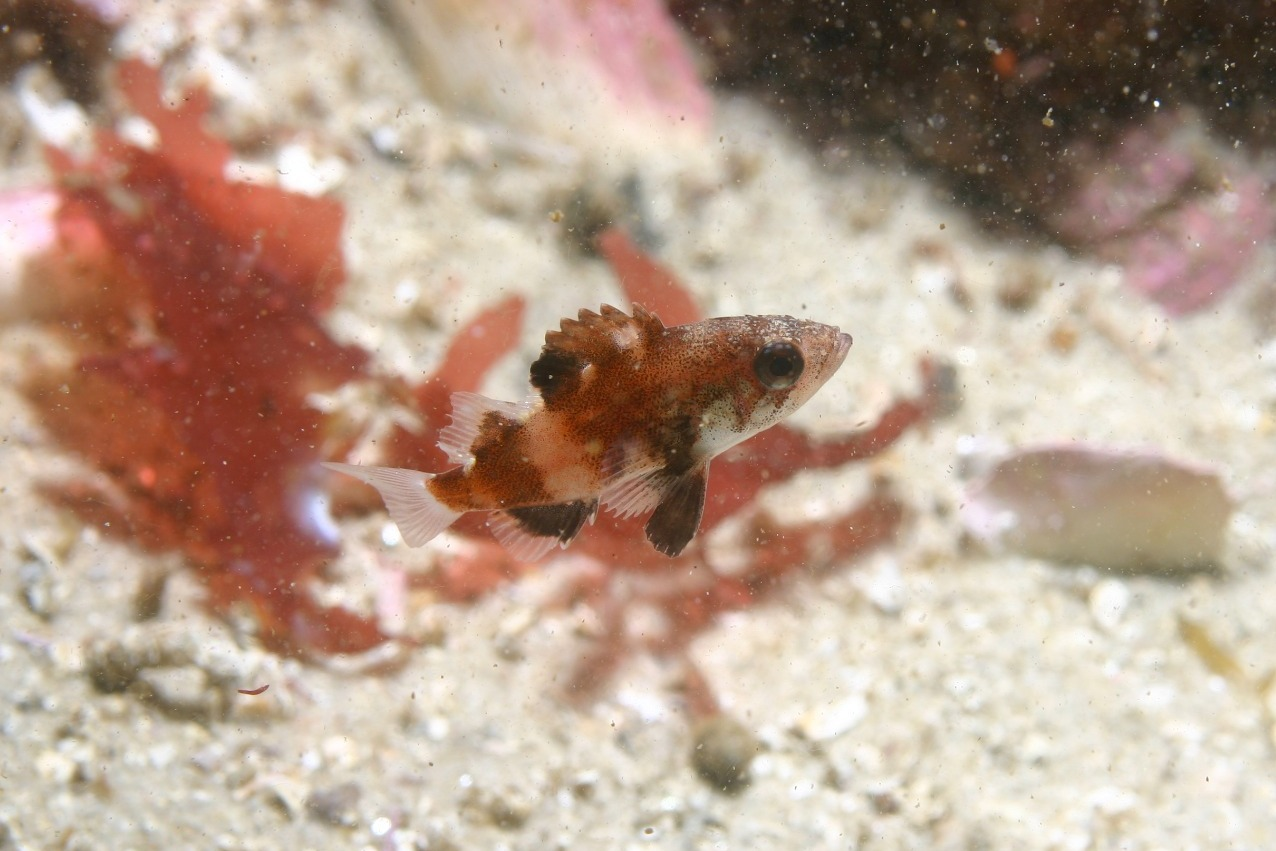
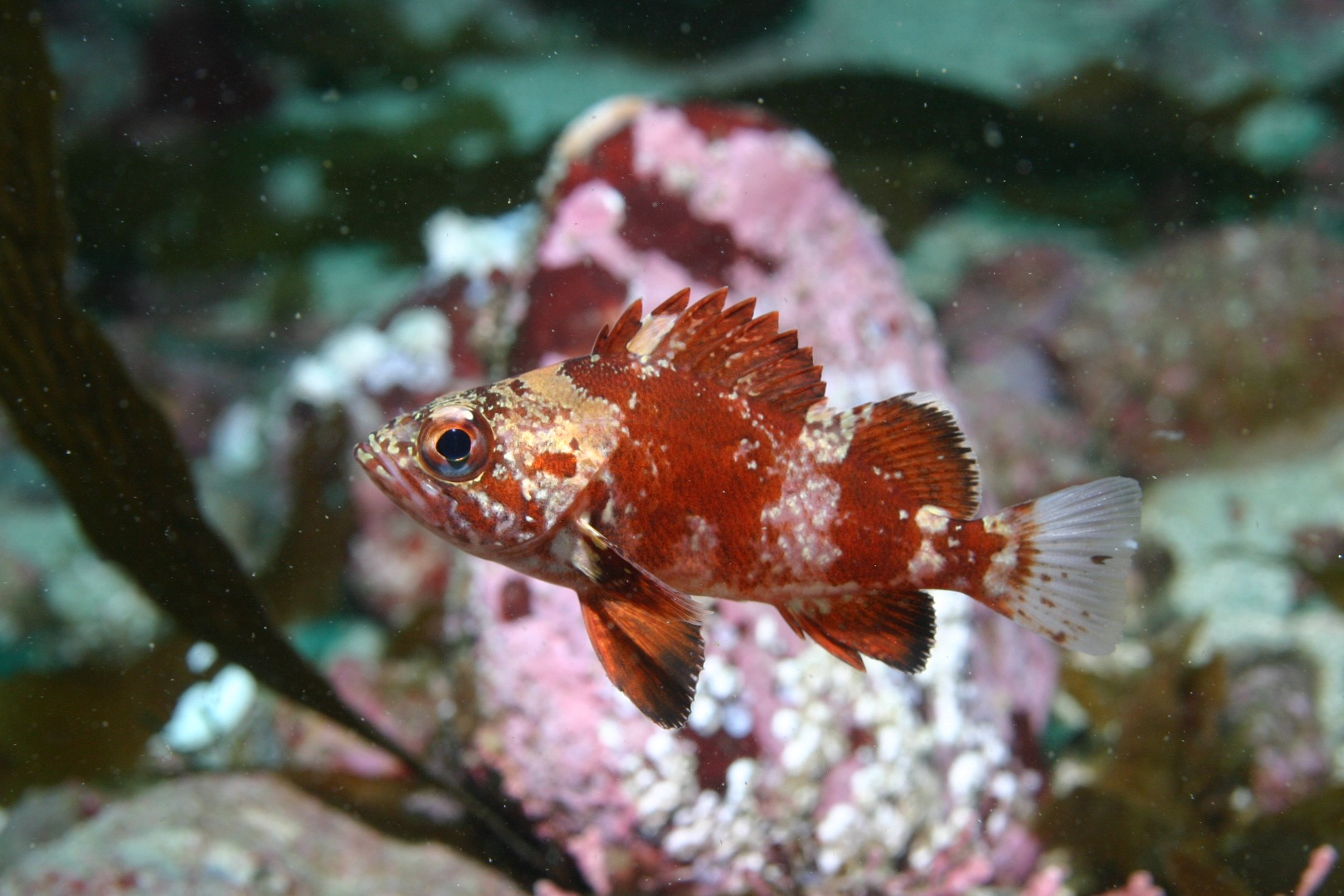
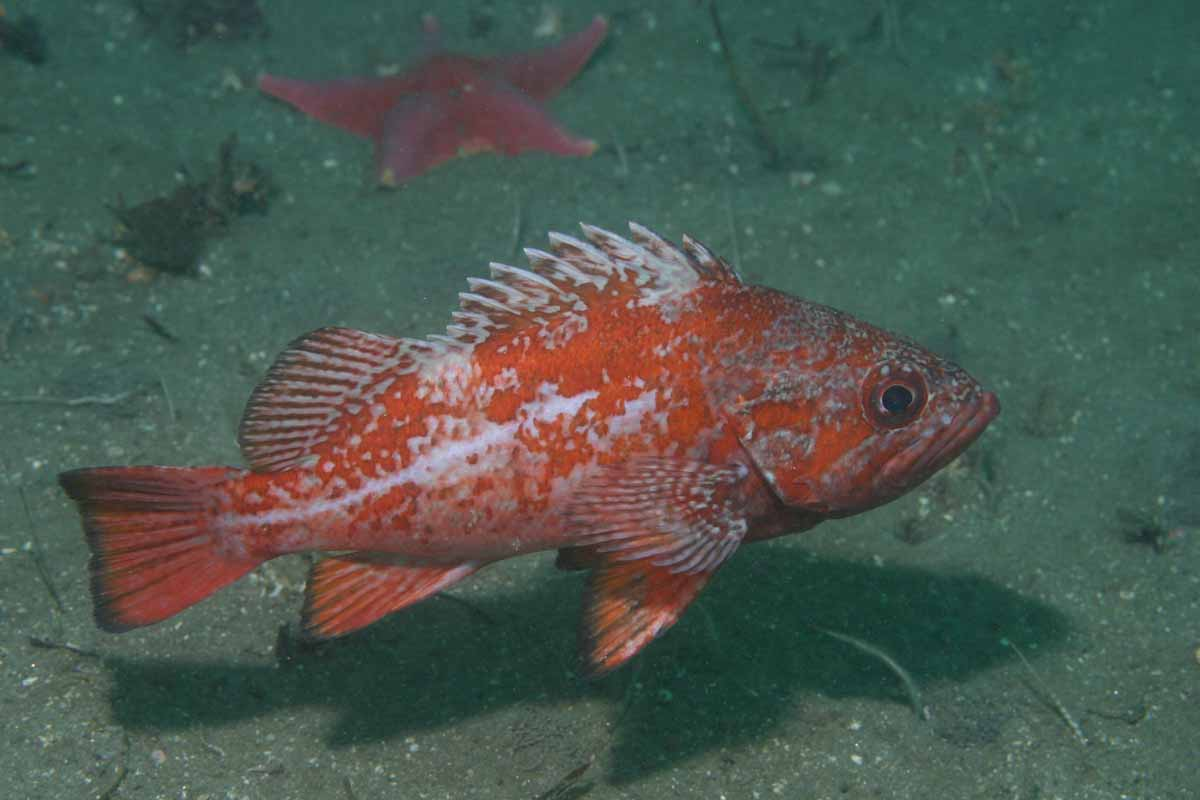
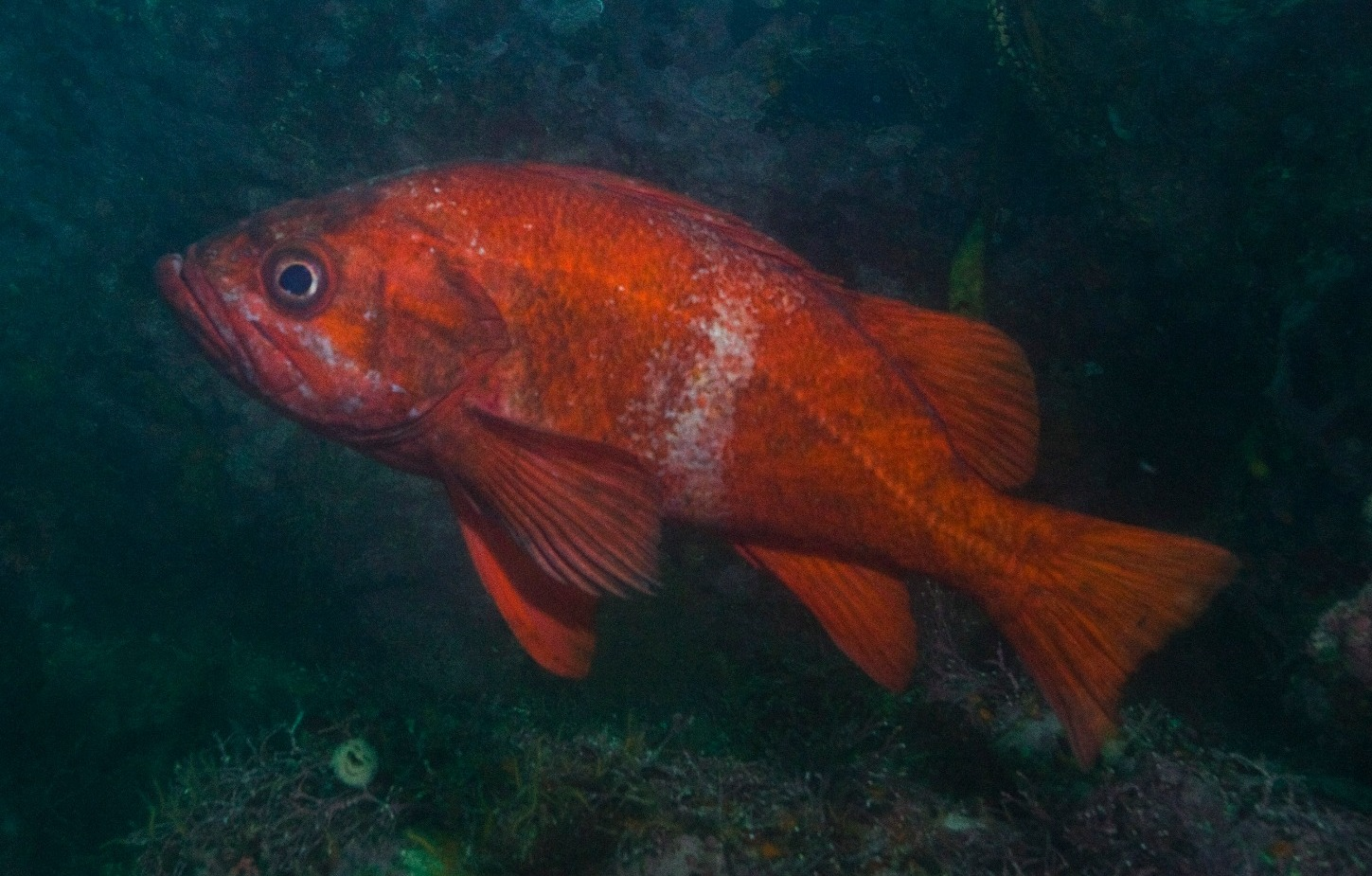
Growth sequence, from youngest juvenile to adult

The color of this species varies from dark red to vermilion with gray or black spotting on the back and flanks. Smaller fishes may have a more mottled pattern than larger fishes. The mouth is red mouth and the red fins are frequently have black margins, again more typical in smaller fishes. Larger individuals show indistinct dark markings on the head and back. There are three indistinct yellow or orange stripes radiating from the eyes. The posterior two thirds of the lateral line has a silvery color.

== Biology ==
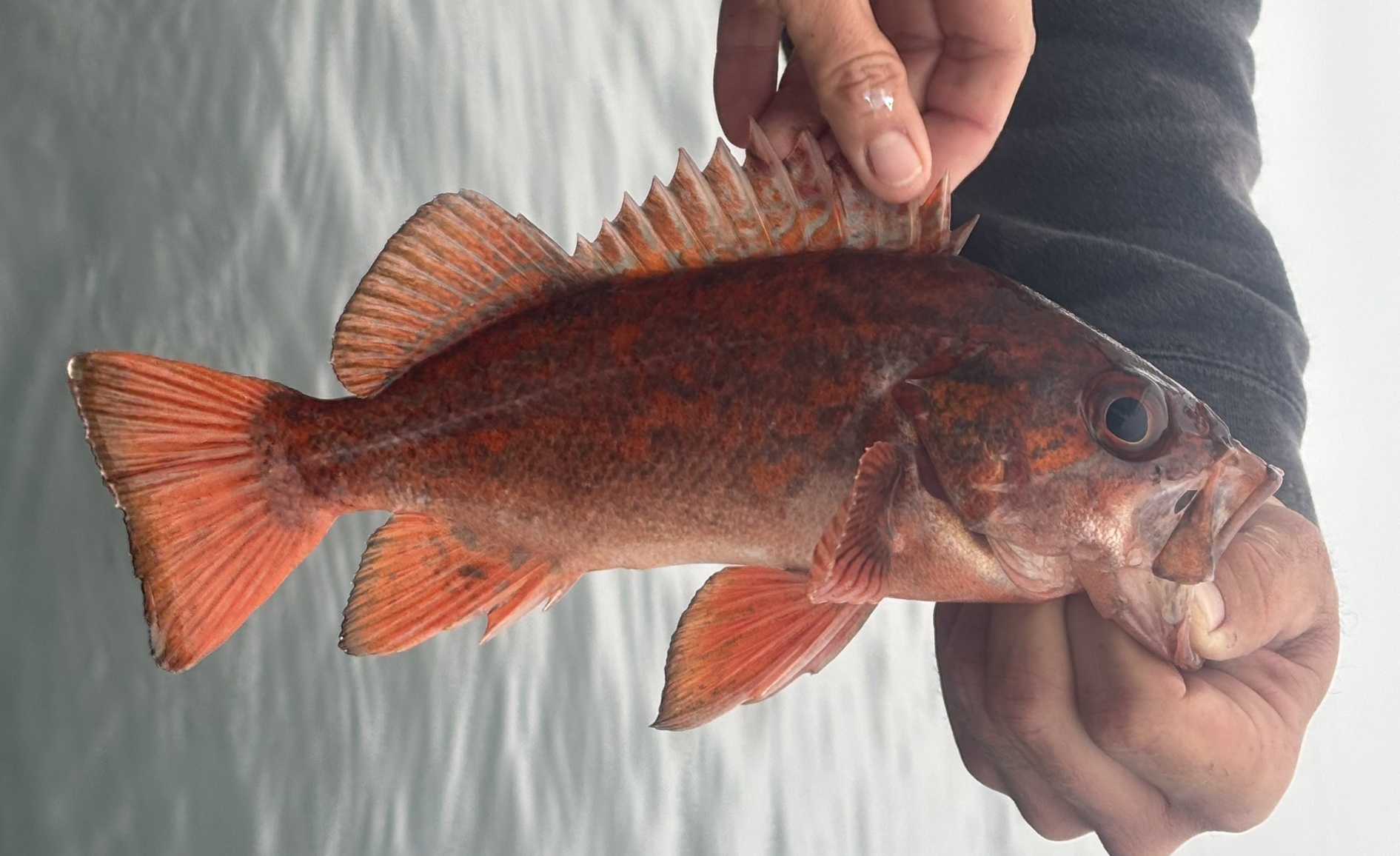
Showing features

Sebastes miniatus may be found in aggregations, in small schools or pairs or even as solitary fish. It is thought that this species can be nomadic and move between reefs. The spines of the dorsal and anal fins have glands in them that can produce a mild venom which may cause painful wounds if they break the skin.

The vermilion rockfish is, like other rockfishes, ovoviviparous, the females give birth to live young and are sexually mature from 4–7 years of age and a length of about 35 cm (14 in). The females extrude the larvae from September to December. The largest females may hold up to 1,600,000 eggs, which hatch internally and the larvae are extruded. The larvae are translucent at first, spending several months offshore among the plankton feeding on zooplankton and gaining color. From the start of February they move inshore and settle. The adults feed almost exclusively on fishes, squid, octopuses and krill.

== Fisheries ==
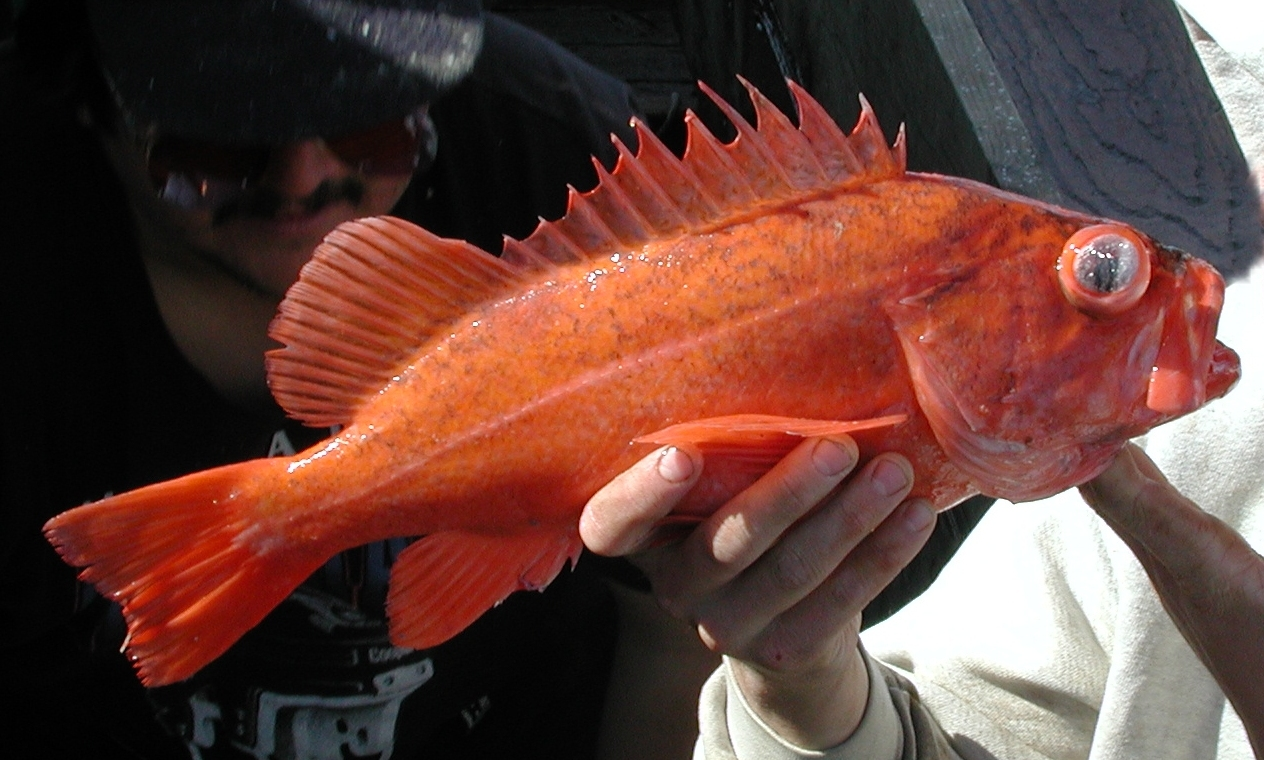
Showing barotrauma after being caught

Sebastes miniatus is targeted by commercial fisheries and is a major component of the landings of rockfish, frequently caught by trawling in deep water as well as by hook and line and gill nets. In California it tends to be caught as bycatch when fishers are targeting bocaccio rockfish (S. paucispinis). It is also an important species in recreational fishing and is the third most frequently caught rockfish species by recreational fisheries off California, and the seventh most landed species overall.
