= Axanthism =

Mutation that interferes with yellow pigment

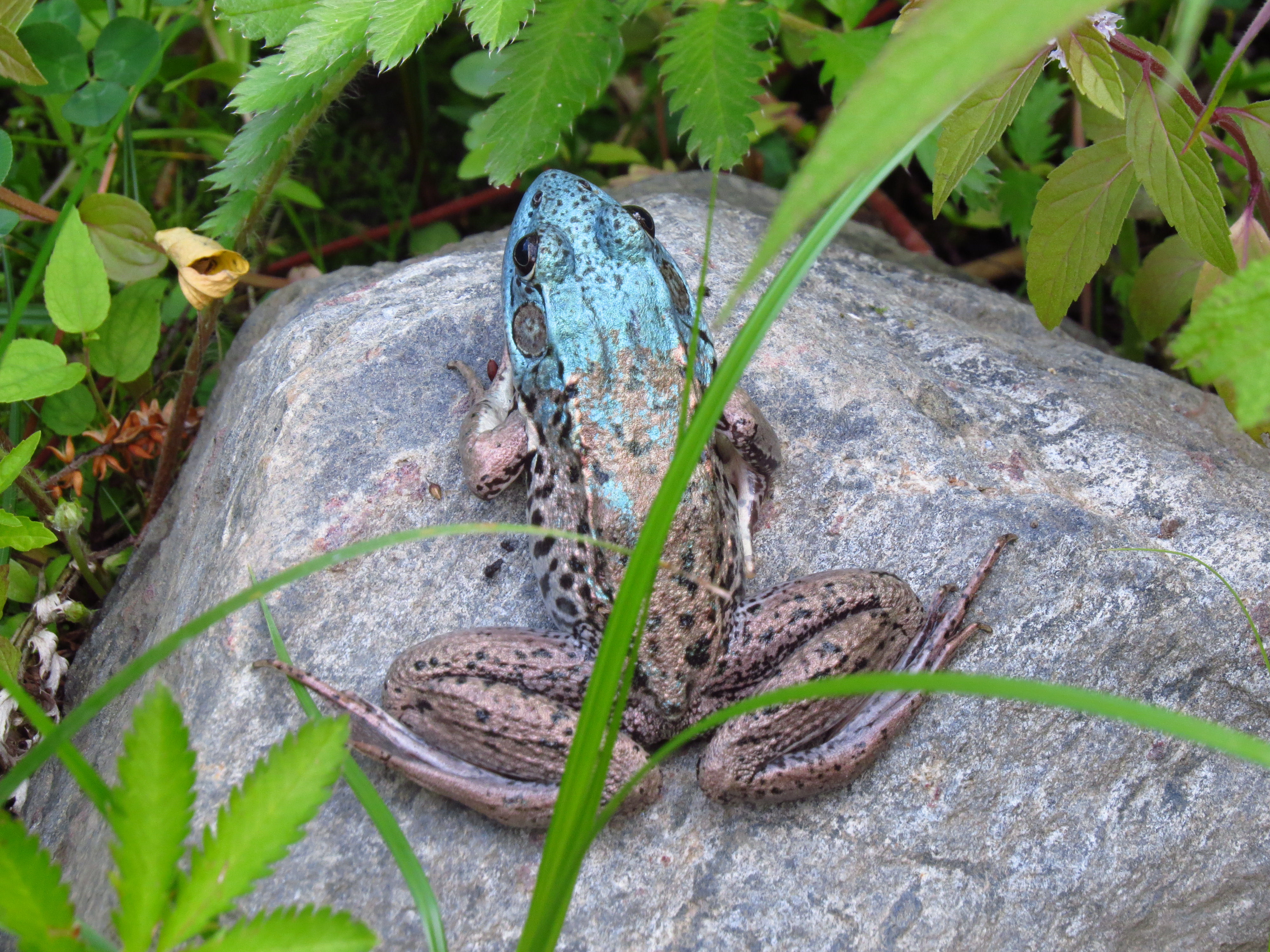
An axanthic green frog (Lithobates clamitans). Axanthism is common in species of Ranidae.

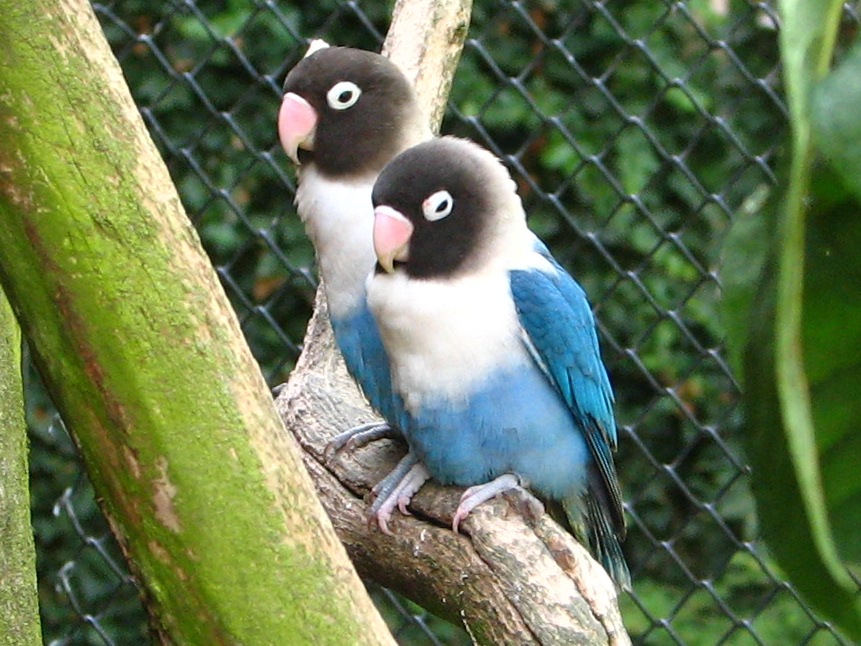
Yellow-collared lovebirds (Agapornis personatus) are a good example of the effects of axanthism. The feathers that would be normally green are blue, and the feathers that would be yellow are white.

Axanthism is a mutation that interferes with an animal's ability to produce yellow pigment. The mutation affects the amount of xanthophores and carotenoid vesicles, sometimes causing them to be completely absent. Erythrophores and iridophores, which are responsible for red coloration and light reflecting pigments respectively, may also be affected. Axanthism is most obvious in green animals, specifically amphibians, making them appear blue. Green coloration in animals is caused by iridiphores reflecting blue wavelengths of light back through the carotenoids in the xanthophores. In the absence of xanthophores and carotenoids, the blue light is unaltered and reflected back normally. Animals that are normally yellow will appear white if affected with axanthism.

While axanthism commonly makes green animals blue, it can also make the animal gray or even black, making it appear as if the animal has melanism; though they can be distinguished by how axanthic animals are slightly lighter and how melanistic animals produce more melanophores. When iridophores are affected by axanthism, the animal typically becomes duller or darker in coloration due to a lesser amount of light reflected. Typically it is only the skin that is affected, and the eyes still have iridophores.

The opposite of axanthism is xanthochromism, which is an excess of yellow coloration.

== In amphibians ==
There are three basic types of axanthism in amphibians: complete to partial blue coloration, complete or partial gray or dark coloration, and normal coloration with black eyes. These are not distinct categories, and there can be amphibians that have a combination of these. The first one is most common in the family Ranidae, which is one of the families that happens to be most commonly affected by axanthism. It is not yet known exactly why axanthism occurs in amphibians and whether it is genetic or environmental. Axanthism seems to be most common in North America, and is more common in Northern regions; there are hundreds of reports of blue green frogs (Lithobates clamitans), and only a few are from the southeastern United States. Axanthism is also most common in frogs, with salamanders and newts having almost no cases.

Axanthic individuals are likely at higher risk at predation by sight predators compared to normal amphibians. Axanthism can affect the camouflage and aposematic patterns of amphibians, making these individual stand out more or render their defenses useless. However, individuals that are darker than normal may have an advantage in thermoregulation, which is especially important in ectothermic vertebrates.
