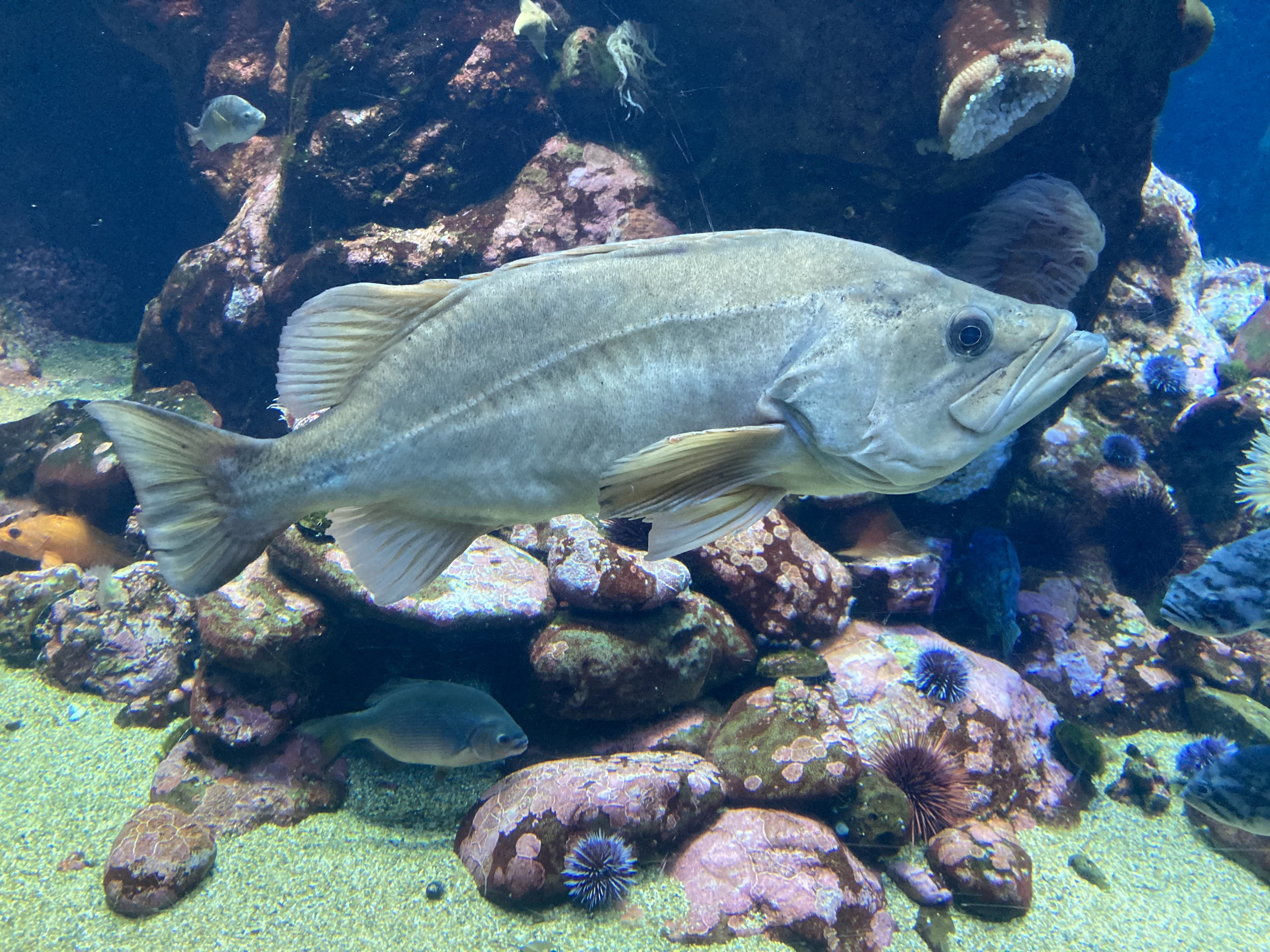
- At the California Academy of Sciences

Conservation status
- Critically Endangered (IUCN 3.1)

- Endangered (ESA)

Scientific classification
- Kingdom: Animalia
- Phylum: Chordata
- Class: Actinopterygii
- Division: Teleostei
- Order: Perciformes
- Family: Scorpaenidae
- Genus: Sebastes
- Species: S. paucispinis

Binomial name
- Sebastes paucispinis Ayres, 1854

Synonyms
- Sebastodes paucispinis (Ayres, 1854); Sebastes paucispinus

= Bocaccio rockfish =

Species of fish

The bocaccio rockfish (Note: Pronunciation: UK: /bəˈkætʃ(i)oʊ/ bə-KATCH-(ee-)oh, US: /bəˈkɑːtʃ(i)oʊ, boʊˈ-/ bə-KAH-ch(ee-)oh, boh-.) (Sebastes paucispinis) is a species of marine ray-finned fish belonging to the subfamily Sebastinae, the rockfishes, part of the family Scorpaenidae, It is found in the northeast Pacific Ocean. It is also known as rock salmon, salmon grouper, rockcod, Pacific red snapper, or simply bocaccio.

== Taxonomy and etymology ==
The bocaccio rockfish was first formally described in 1854 by the American zoologist William Orville Ayres with the type locality given as California. Some authorities place this species in the subgenus Sebastodes, of which it is the type species. The specific name paucispinis is a compound of paucis meaning "poor", "few" or "insufficient" and spinus meaning "spine" a reference to the smaller number of and weaker spines on head in comparison to the China rockfish (S. nebulosus) which Ayres described in the same paper.

== Distribution and biology ==
Bocaccio can be found from Stepovak Bay, Alaska to central Baja California, but is mostly abundant from Oregon to northern Baja California. They have been spotted from various depths from the surface to 1,568 feet (478 m); most live between 150–1,000 feet (46–305 m). Juveniles stay in shallower water because of the protection provided by floating kelp mats or driftwood. Shallow water kelp forests and oil platforms also help these fish avoid danger, as they can use them to dodge and hide from predators. As the fish get older, they to move into deeper, colder water. The Monterey submarine canyon is an ideal place for many marine organisms to inhabit or migrate through, and bocaccio in this canyon can consume multiple marine species such as shellfish (pelagic shrimp and crabs), anchovies, sardines, other small rockfishes, and squid. Adult bocaccio are known to prefer fish, while the juveniles are more opportunistic, and feed on zooplankton like copepods.

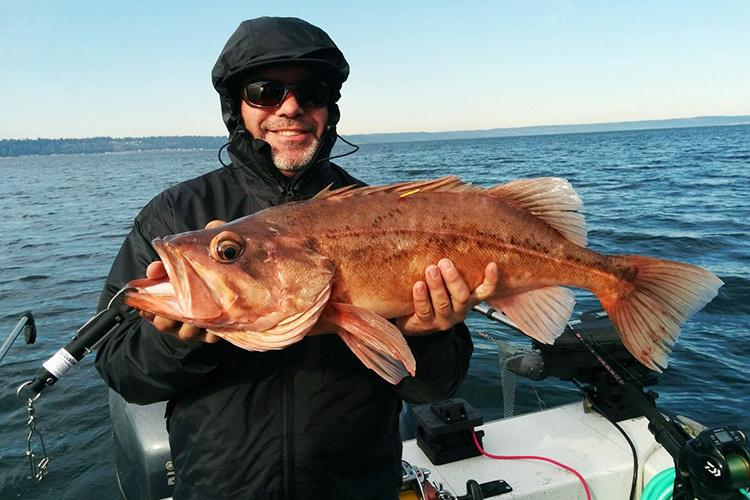
A fisher holding a Bocaccio Rockfish displaying typical orange coloration. Courtesy of NOAA Fisheries

The bocaccio is one of the larger rockfish and can grow up to 3 feet (0.91 m) in length, 27.9 lb (12.7 kg) in weight, and live to at least 50 years. A bocaccio that is 12 inches (30 cm) long is around 3–4 years old and a 2-foot (0.61 m) long fish is 7–8 years old. Females grow faster than males and also live longer. There is a difference in maturity rates from north to south. Southern California bocaccio mature at 14 inches and reproduce at around 18 inches (460 mm), while northern males mature at 22 inches (56 cm) and females at 24 inches (61 cm).

They are viviparous rockfish; in Southern California they spawn their larvae in 2 or more batches and spawning occurs almost all year. In Central and Northern California they spawn from January to May, while further north spawning is restricted to January to March. One female can produce over 2 million eggs per season. Compared to other rockfish (besides a small amount also in the subgenus Sebastodes), they are more elongated and have a longer lower jaw and elongated snout.

Coloration is olive-brown dorsally becoming pink to red ventrally, to a copper-orange or deep red pattern. The ribcage can often been seen externally. They may also have black blotches along the body.

== Environmental effects ==
Juvenile, from a pier in California

Certain effects of strong and weak upwelling affect the bocaccio's food sources and the survival of its larvae. Larval rockfish are abundant in or near front upwelling fronts. When the water is cold the upwelling is strong with more productivity and warmer water produces a weaker upwelling with a low amount of resources. Also, a weak upwelling may affect reproduction in egg size, egg amount, and egg quality. El Niño and La Niña effect of the upwelling due to the drastic changes in the warmth of water. They are also affected by overfishing.

== Conservation ==
Recreational and commercial fisheries off the coast of California rely heavily on bocaccio. They are caught by trawling, gillnetting and hook and line. Overfishing has occurred over the past decade. Commercial fishermen tend to target bocaccio due to their abundance and longer shelf life. The permitted depths of fishing have decreased, as older and larger bocaccio tend to stay deeper, because the deepest fishermen can fish at is around 240 feet (73 m) in some areas (2025).

Studies off of Southern California oil platforms show they have produced a slight increase on bocaccio population. Juveniles like to use these platforms as they provide a resemblance of a natural habitat with more protection, and because of the availability of plankton. Studies showed that out of eight platforms there was a large amount of young juvenile bocaccio at seven platforms.

In January 2001 the U.S. National Marine Fisheries Service (NMFS) received a petition to list the southern population of bocaccio as a Threatened species under the U.S. Endangered Species Act (ESA). In November 2002, NMFS published its recommendation that ESA listing was not warranted.

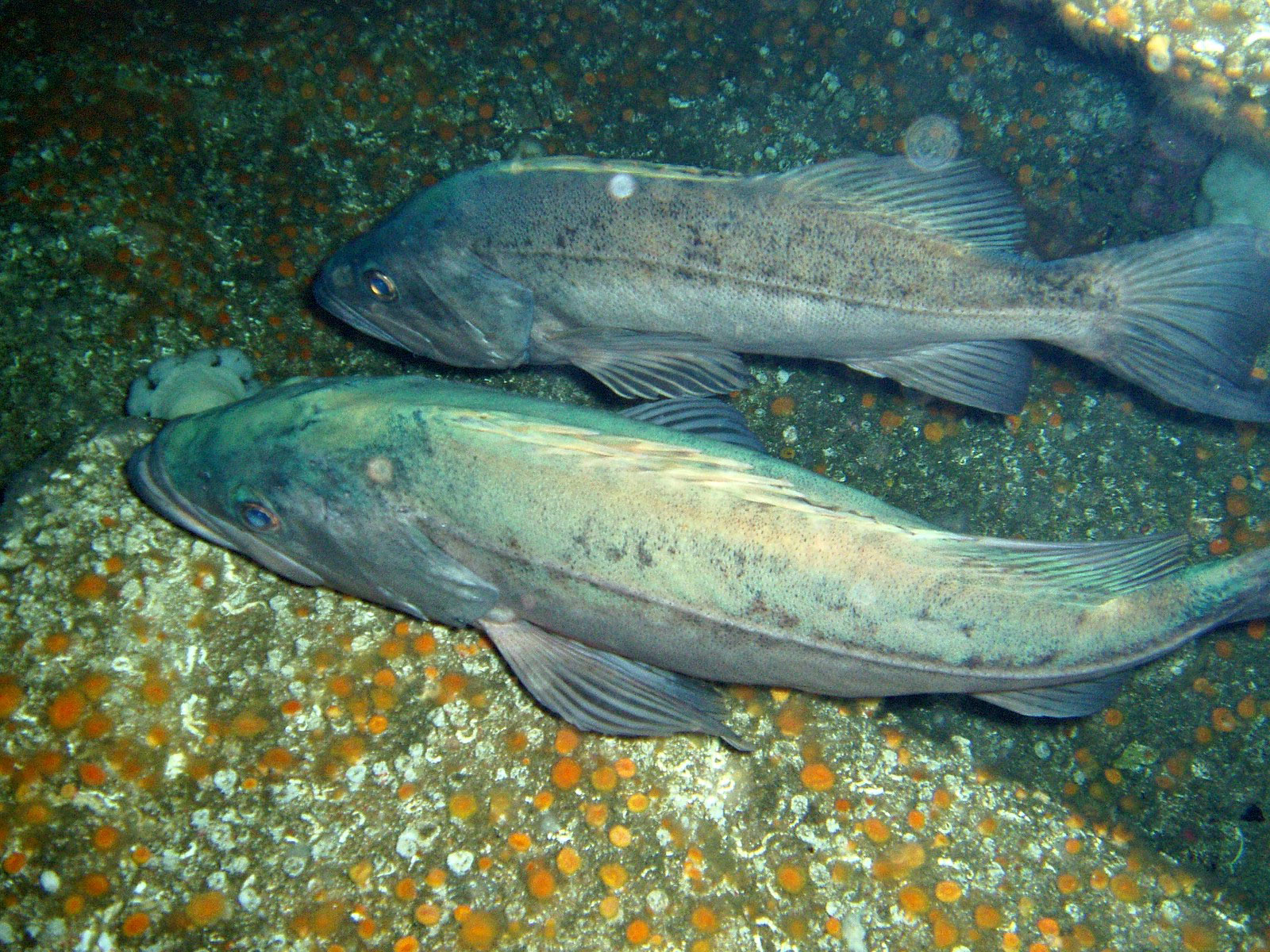
At the Monterey Bay Aquarium

The southern distinct population segment of bocaccio is a U.S. National Marine Fisheries Service Species of Concern. Species of Concern are those species about which the U.S. Government's National Oceanic and Atmospheric Administration, National Marine Fisheries Service has some concerns regarding status and threats, but for which insufficient information is available to indicate a need to list the species under the U.S. Endangered Species Act

On October 29, 2007, NMFS received a petition from Mr. Wright to list the Puget Sound DPS of bocaccio under the ESA. NMFS listed the Puget Sound/Georgia basin Distinct population segment as endangered on April 28, 2010. Critical habitat was designated on November 13, 2014.
