= Charles Beeson =

Charles Beeson may refer to:

- Charles H. Beeson (1870–1949), American classical scholar
- Charles Beeson (director) (1957–2021), British television director
