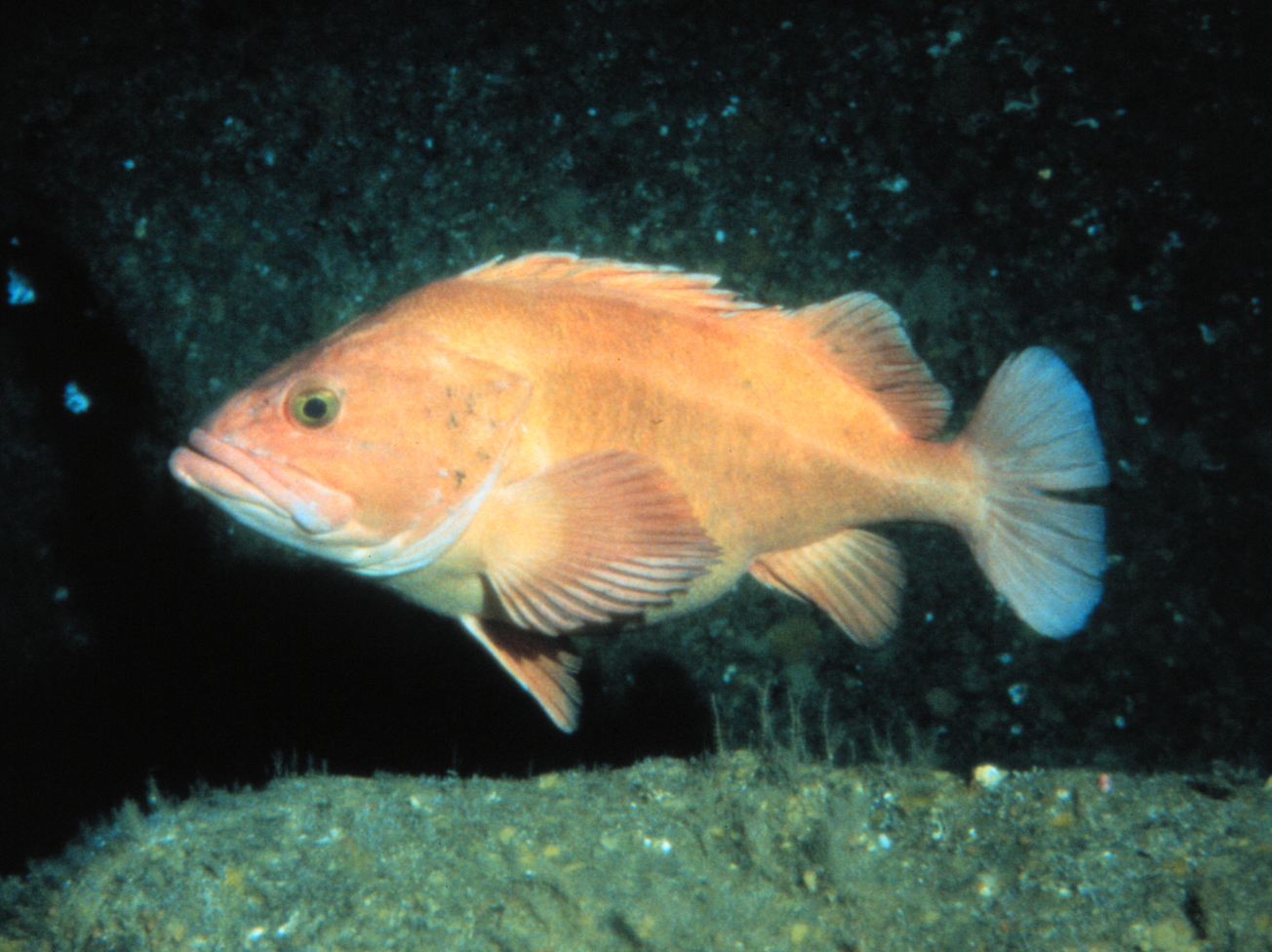
- Yelloweye rockfish (S. ruberrimus)

Scientific classification
- Kingdom: Animalia
- Phylum: Chordata
- Class: Actinopterygii
- Division: Teleostei
- Order: Perciformes
- Family: Scorpaenidae
- Subfamily: Sebastinae
- Genus: Sebastes; G. Cuvier, 1829

Type species
- Sebastes norvegicus (Ascanius, 1772)

Synonyms
- List: Acutomentum C. H. Eigenmann & Beeson, 1893; Allosebastes Hubbs, 1951; Auctospina Eigenmann & Beeson, 1893; Emmelas Jordan & Evermann, 1898; Eosebastes Jordan & Evermann, 1896; Eusebastes Sauvage, 1878; Hatumeus Matsubara, 1943; Hispaniscus Jordan & Evermann, 1896; Mebarus Matsubara, 1943; Murasoius Matsubara, 1943; Neohispaniscus Matsubara, 1943; Perca Ascanius, 1772; Pteropodus Eigenmann & Beeson, 1893; Primospina Eigenmann & Beeson, 1893; Rosicola Jordan & Evermann, 1896; Sebastichthys Gill, 1862; Sebastocarus Jordan & Evermann, 1927; Sebastocles Jordan & Hubbs, 1925; Sebastodes Gill, 1861; Sebastomus Gill, 1864; Sebastopyr Jordan & Evermann, 1927; Sebastomus Gill, 1864; Takenokius Matsubara, 1943; Zalopyr Jordan & Evermann, 1898

= Sebastes =

Sebastes Temporal range: 33.9–0 Ma Early Oligocene to present

Genus of fishes

Sebastes is a genus of marine ray-finned fish belonging to the subfamily Sebastinae part of the family Scorpaenidae, most of which have the common name of rockfish. A few are called ocean perch, sea perch or redfish instead. They are found in the Atlantic and Pacific Oceans.

== Taxonomy ==
Sebastes was first described as a genus in 1829 by the French zoologist Georges Cuvier, the Dutch ichthyologist Pieter Bleeker designated Perca norvegica, which may have been originally described by the Norwegian zoologist Peter Ascanius in 1772, as the type species in 1876. The genus is the type genus of both the tribe Sebastini and the subfamily Sebastinae, although some authorities treat these as the subfamily Sebastinae and the family Sebastidae, separating the Sebastidae as a distinct family from the Scorpaenidae. Other authorities place it in the Perciformes in the suborder Scorpaenoidei.

The genus name is derived from the Greek Sebastos, an honorific used in ancient Greek for the Roman imperial title of Augustus, an allusion to the old name for S. norvegicus on Ibiza, its type locality, which Cuvier translated as "august" or "venerable".

The fossil record of rockfish goes back to the Miocene, with unequivocal whole body fossils and otoliths from California and Japan (although fossil otoliths from Belgium, "Sebastes" weileri, may push the record back as far as the early Oligocene).

== Species ==
Sebastes contains 109 recognized extant species:

| Subgenus | Image | Scientific name | Common name | Distribution |
|---|---|---|---|---|
| Zalopyr Jordan & Evermann, 1898 | | Sebastes aleutianus (D. S. Jordan & Evermann, 1898) | rougheye rockfish | North Pacific (coast of Japan to the Navarin Canyon in the Bering Sea, to the Aleutian Islands, all the way south to San Diego, California) |
| Zalopyr Jordan & Evermann, 1898 | | Sebastes borealis (Barsukov, 1970) | shortraker rockfish | Pacific Ocean (southeastern Kamchatka Peninsula, Russia, to Fort Bragg, California) |
| Zalopyr Jordan & Evermann, 1898 | | Sebastes matsubarai (Hilgendorf, 1880) | | Northern Japan |
| Zalopyr Jordan & Evermann, 1898 | | Sebastes melanostictus (Matsubara, 1934) | blackspotted rockfish | North Pacific |
| Acutomentum Eigenmann & Beeson, 1893 | | Sebastes alutus (C. H. Gilbert, 1890) | Pacific Ocean perch | North Pacific (southern California around the Pacific rim to northern Honshū, Japan, including the Bering Sea) |
| Acutomentum Eigenmann & Beeson, 1893 | | Sebastes baramenuke (Wakiya, 1917) | | Pacific Ocean ( northern Japan to South Korea) |
| Acutomentum Eigenmann & Beeson, 1893 | | Sebastes brevispinis (T. H. Bean, 1884) | silvergray rockfish | Pacific Ocean (Bering Sea coast of Alaska to Baja California) |
| Acutomentum Eigenmann & Beeson, 1893 | | Sebastes entomelas (D. S. Jordan & C. H. Gilbert, 1880) | widow rockfish | Western North America from Alaska to Baja California |
| Acutomentum Eigenmann & Beeson, 1893 | | Sebastes flammeus (D. S. Jordan & Starks, 1904) | | Northwest Pacific |
| Acutomentum Eigenmann & Beeson, 1893 | | Sebastes hopkinsi (Cramer, 1895) | squarespot rockfish | Eastern Pacific |
| Acutomentum Eigenmann & Beeson, 1893 | | Sebastes iracundus (D. S. Jordan & Starks, 1904) | | Northwest Pacific |
| Acutomentum Eigenmann & Beeson, 1893 | | Sebastes kiyomatsui (Y. Kai & Nakabo, 2004) | | Japan |
| Acutomentum Eigenmann & Beeson, 1893 | | Sebastes macdonaldi (C. H. Eigenmann & Beeson, 1893) | Mexican rockfish | California, US, to southern Baja California, Mexico and the Gulf of California |
| Acutomentum Eigenmann & Beeson, 1893 | | Sebastes minor (Barsukov, 1972) | | Hokkaido, Japan to Sakhalin, Primorskii Krai, and the southern Kuril Islands |
| Acutomentum Eigenmann & Beeson, 1893 | | Sebastes ovalis (Ayres, 1862) | speckled rockfish | Eastern Pacific |
| Acutomentum Eigenmann & Beeson, 1893 | | Sebastes rufus (C. H. Eigenmann & R. S. Eigenmann, 1890) | bank rockfish | Fort Bragg in northern California, US, to central Baja California and Guadalupe Island (off northern central Baja California) in Mexico |
| Acutomentum Eigenmann & Beeson, 1893 | | Sebastes scythropus (D. S. Jordan & Snyder, 1900) | | Japan |
| Acutomentum Eigenmann & Beeson, 1893 | | Sebastes wakiyai (Matsubara, 1934) | | Japan and South Korea |
| Mebarus Matsubara 1943 | | Sebastes atrovirens (D. S. Jordan & C. H. Gilbert, 1880) | kelp rockfish | Pacific Ocean (coast of California in the United States and Baja California in Mexico) |
| Mebarus Matsubara 1943 | | Sebastes cheni (Barsukov, 1988) | Japanese white seaperch or Japanese blue seaperch | Northwest Pacific |
| Mebarus Matsubara 1943 | | Sebastes inermis (G. Cuvier, 1829) | Japanese red seaperch | Coasts of Japan and the Korean Peninsula |
| Mebarus Matsubara 1943 | | Sebastes joyneri (Günther, 1878) | Togot seaperch, or offshore seaperch | Japan and Korea |
| Mebarus Matsubara 1943 | | Sebastes taczanowskii (Steindachner, 1880) | white-edged rockfish | Northwest Pacific coast |
| Mebarus Matsubara 1943 | | Sebastes thompsoni (D. S. Jordan & C. L. Hubbs, 1925) | | Northern Japan |
| Mebarus Matsubara 1943 | | Sebastes ventricosus (Temminck & Schlegel, 1843 ) | Japanese black seaperch | Northwest Pacific |
| Auctospina Eigenmann & Beeson 1893 | | Sebastes auriculatus (Girard, 1854) | brown rockfish | Pacific Ocean (Bahia San Hipolito in southern Baja California to Prince William Sound in the northern Gulf of Alaska) |
| Auctospina Eigenmann & Beeson 1893 | | Sebastes dallii (C. H. Eigenmann & Beeson, 1894) | calico rockfish | Eastern central Pacific |
| Eosebastes Jordan & Evermann, 1896 | | Sebastes aurora (C. H. Gilbert, 1890) | aurora rockfish | North Pacific |
| Eosebastes Jordan & Evermann, 1896 | | Sebastes crameri (D. S. Jordan, 1897) | darkblotched rockfish | Pacific Ocean (southeast of Zhemchug Canyon in the Bering Sea to Santa Catalina Island, California) |
| Eosebastes Jordan & Evermann, 1896 | | Sebastes melanosema (R. N. Lea & Fitch, 1979) | semaphore rockfish | Southern California, US, to central Baja California, Mexico |
| Eosebastes Jordan & Evermann, 1896 | | Sebastes melanostomus (C. H. Eigenmann & R. S. Eigenmann, 1890) | blackgill rockfish | Washington, US, to central Baja California, Mexico |
| Rosicola Jordan & Evermann, 1896 | | Sebastes babcocki (W. F. Thompson, 1915) | redbanded rockfish | Pacific Ocean ( Zhemchug Canyon in the Bering Sea and the Aleutians south to San Diego, California) |
| Rosicola Jordan & Evermann, 1896 | | Sebastes miniatus (D. S. Jordan & C. H. Gilbert, 1880) | vermilion rockfish | North America from Baja California to Alaska |
| Rosicola Jordan & Evermann, 1896 | | Sebastes pinniger (T. N. Gill, 1864) | canary rockfish | south of Shelikof Strait in the eastern Gulf of Alaska to Punta Colonet in northern Baja California |
| Sebastomus Gill, 1864 | | Sebastes capensis (J. F. Gmelin, 1789) | Cape redfish | Western coast of South Africa, Tristan da Cunha and southern South America |
| Sebastomus Gill, 1864 | | Sebastes chlorostictus (D. S. Jordan & C. H. Gilbert, 1880) | greenspotted rockfish | Eastern Pacific |
| Sebastomus Gill, 1864 | | Sebastes constellatus (D. S. Jordan & C. H. Gilbert, 1880) | starry rockfish | Pacific Ocean (California and Baja California) |
| Sebastomus Gill, 1864 | | Sebastes ensifer (L. C. Chen, 1971) | swordspine rockfish | Central Pacific |
| Sebastomus Gill, 1864 | | Sebastes eos (C. H. Eigenmann & R. S. Eigenmann, 1890) | pink rockfish | Monterey Bay in California, US, to central Baja California, Mexico |
| Sebastomus Gill, 1864 | | Sebastes exsul (L. C. Chen, 1971) | buccaneer rockfish | Central Pacific: western Gulf of California |
| Sebastomus Gill, 1864 | | Sebastes helvomaculatus (Ayres, 1859 ) | rosethorn rockfish | Eastern Pacific |
| Sebastomus Gill, 1864 | | Sebastes lentiginosus (L. C. Chen, 1971) | freckled rockfish | Santa Catalina Island in southern California, US, to northern Baja California |
| Sebastomus Gill, 1864 | | Sebastes notius (L. C. Che, 1971) | | Guadalupe Island, Mexico |
| Sebastomus Gill, 1864 | | Sebastes oculatus (Valenciennes, 1833) | Patagonian redfish | Southeast Pacific and Southwest Atlantic: Chile, Argentina, and the Falkland Islands |
| Sebastomus Gill, 1864 | | Sebastes rosaceus (Ayres, 1854 ) | rosy rockfish | Eastern Pacific |
| Sebastomus Gill, 1864 | | Sebastes rosenblatti (L. C. Chen, 1971) | greenblotched rockfish | San Francisco in California, US, to central Baja California, Mexico |
| Sebastomus Gill, 1864 | | Sebastes serranoides (C. H. Eigenmann & R. S. Eigenmann, 1890) | olive rockfish | Eastern Pacific |
| Sebastomus Gill, 1864 | | Sebastes simulator (L. C. Chen, 1971 ) | pinkrose rockfish | San Pedro in southern California, US, to Guadalupe Island (off northern central Baja California) in Mexico |
| Sebastomus Gill, 1864 | | Sebastes spinorbis (L. C. Chen, 1975) | | Eastern Central Pacific |
| Sebastomus Gill, 1864 | | Sebastes umbrosus (D. S. Jordan & C. H. Gilbert, 1882) | honeycomb rockfish | Point Pinos, Monterey County, in central California, US, to southern central Baja California, Mexico |
| Pteropodus Eigenmann & Beeson, 1893 | | Sebastes carnatus (D. S. Jordan & C. H. Gilbert, 1880) | gopher rockfish | Pacific Ocean ( Cape Blanco in Oregon, down to Punta San Roque in southern Baja California) |
| Pteropodus Eigenmann & Beeson, 1893 | | Sebastes caurinus (J. Richardson, 1844) | copper rockfish | Pacific Ocean (Gulf of Alaska, to the Pacific side of the Baja California peninsula, north of Guerrero Negro) |
| Pteropodus Eigenmann & Beeson, 1893 | | Sebastes chrysomelas (D. S. Jordan & C. H. Gilbert, 1881) | black-and-yellow rockfish | Pacific Ocean (off California and Baja California) |
| Pteropodus Eigenmann & Beeson, 1893 | | Sebastes hubbsi (Matsubara, 1937) | | Northwest Pacific |
| Pteropodus Eigenmann & Beeson, 1893 | | Sebastes longispinis (Matsubara, 1934) | | Japan and South Korea |
| Pteropodus Eigenmann & Beeson, 1893 | | Sebastes maliger (D. S. Jordan & C. H. Gilbert, 1880) | quillback rockfish | Pacific coast from the Gulf of Alaska to the northern Channel Islands of Southern California |
| Pteropodus Eigenmann & Beeson, 1893 | | Sebastes nebulosus (Ayres, 1854 ) | China rockfish | Kachemak Bay in the northern Gulf of Alaska to Redondo Beach and San Nicolas Island in southern California |
| Pteropodus Eigenmann & Beeson, 1893 | | Sebastes nivosus (Hilgendorf, 1880) | | |
| Pteropodus Eigenmann & Beeson, 1893 | | Sebastes rastrelliger (D. S. Jordan & C. H. Gilbert, 1880) | grass rockfish | Eastern Pacific |
| Pteropodus Eigenmann & Beeson, 1893 | | Sebastes trivittatus (Hilgendorf, 1880) | threestripe rockfish | Japan and Korea |
| Sebastosomus Gill, 1864 | | Sebastes ciliatus (Tilesius, 1813) | dusky rockfish | Pacific Ocean (Bering Sea near British Columbia, in the Gulf of Alaska, and in the depths of the Aleutian Islands) |
| Sebastosomus Gill, 1864 | | Sebastes diaconus (Frable, D. W. Wagman, Frierson, A. Aguilar & Sidlauskas, 2015) | deacon rockfish | Northern California to southern British Columbia |
| Sebastosomus Gill, 1864 | | Sebastes flavidus (Ayres, 1862) | Yellowtail rockfish | San Diego, California, to Kodiak Island, Alaska |
| Sebastosomus Gill, 1864 | | Sebastes melanops (Girard, 1856 ) | black rockfish | Oregon, California, Washington, British Columbia, Alaska |
| Sebastosomus Gill, 1864 | | Sebastes mystinus (D. S. Jordan & C. H. Gilbert, 1881) | blue rockfish | northeastern Pacific Ocean, ranging from northern Baja California to central Oregon |
| Sebastosomus Gill, 1864 | | Sebastes variabilis (Pallas, 1814) | light dusky rockfish | Japan, east coast of Kamchatka to Cape Ol'utorskii in western Bering Sea, along the Aleutian Islands in the eastern Bering Sea, through the Gulf of Alaska south to Johnstone Strait, British Columbia and to central Oregon |
| Allosebastes Hubbs, 1951 | | Sebastes cortezi (Beebe & Tee-Van, 1938) | Cortez rockfish | Pacific Ocean (Gulf of California along the coast of Baja California, Mexico) |
| Allosebastes Hubbs, 1951 | | Sebastes diploproa (C. H. Gilbert, 1890) | splitnose rockfish | Northeast Pacific |
| Allosebastes Hubbs, 1951 | | Sebastes emphaeus (Starks, 1911) | Puget Sound rockfish | Pacific Ocean (Kenai Peninsula, Alaska to northern California) |
| Allosebastes Hubbs, 1951 | | Sebastes peduncularis (L. C. Chen, 1975) | | Eastern Central Pacific |
| Allosebastes Hubbs, 1951 | | Sebastes proriger (D. S. Jordan & C. H. Gilbert, 1880) | redstripe rockfish | Bering Sea and Amchitka Island in the Aleutian chain to San Diego, California |
| Allosebastes Hubbs, 1951 | | Sebastes rufinanus (R. N. Lea & Fitch, 1972) | dwarf red rockfish | eastern central Pacific, especially around San Clemente Island off the coast of southern California |
| Allosebastes Hubbs, 1951 | | Sebastes saxicola (C. H. Gilbert, 1890) | stripetail rockfish | Yakutat Bay, Alaska to Rompiente Point, Baja California, Mexico |
| Allosebastes Hubbs, 1951 | | Sebastes semicinctus (C. H. Gilbert, 1897) | halfbanded rockfish | Eastern Central Pacific |
| Allosebastes Hubbs, 1951 | | Sebastes sinensis (C. H. Gilbert, 1890) | blackmouth rockfish | Gulf of California |
| Allosebastes Hubbs, 1951 | | Sebastes variegatus (Quast, 1971) | harlequin rockfish | Bowers Bank and Petrel Bank in the Aleutian chain to Newport, Oregon, US |
| Allosebastes Hubbs, 1951 | | Sebastes varispinis (L. C. Chen, 1975) | | Eastern Central Pacific |
| Allosebastes Hubbs, 1951 | | Sebastes wilsoni (C. H. Gilbert, 1915) | pygmy rockfish | East Pacific, for the Gulf of Alaska to Baja California, Mexico |
| Allosebastes Hubbs, 1951 | | Sebastes zacentrus (C. H. Gilbert, 1890) | sharpchin rockfish | Semisopochnoi Island in the Aleutian chain to San Diego, California, US |
| Hispaniscus Jordan & Evermann, 1896 | | Sebastes elongatus (Ayres, 1859) | greenstriped rockfish | Northeast Pacific |
| Hispaniscus Jordan & Evermann, 1896 | | Sebastes levis (C. H. Eigenmann & R. S. Eigenmann, 1889) | cowcod | Southern California |
| Hispaniscus Jordan & Evermann, 1896 | | Sebastes rubrivinctus (D. S. Jordan & C. H. Gilbert, 1880) | flag rockfish | California and Baja California |
| Sebastes Cuvier, 1829 | | Sebastes fasciatus (D. H. Storer (fr), 1854) | Acadian redfish | Northwestern Atlantic Ocean and its range extends from Virginia, the Gulf of St. Lawrence, Nova Scotia, western Greenland and Iceland |
| Sebastes Cuvier, 1829 | | Sebastes mentella (Travin, 1951) | deepwater redfish | North Atlantic |
| Sebastes Cuvier, 1829 | | Sebastes norvegicus (Ascanius, 1772) | golden redfish | North Atlantic |
| Sebastes Cuvier, 1829 | | Sebastes viviparus (Krøyer, 1845) | Norway redfish | Norwegian coast from Kattegat to Tanafjord in Finnmark, rare off Bear Island, northern part of North Sea, around Shetland Islands, Scotland, northern England, Wales and Ireland, rare in the English Channel; Rockall Bank, common around Faroes and Iceland; sporadic off East Greenland |
| Emmelas Jordan & Evermann 1898 | | Sebastes glaucus (Hilgendorf, 1880) | Gray rockfish | Northwest Pacific |
| Incertae sedis | | Sebastes gilli (R. S. Eigenmann, 1891) | Bronzespotted rockfish | Monterey Bay in California, US, to northern Baja California, Mexico |
| Incertae sedis | | Sebastes koreanus (I. S. Kim & W. O. Lee, 1994) | | Korea |
| Incertae sedis | | Sebastes moseri (Eitner, 1999) | whitespeckled rockfish | Northeast Pacific |
| Incertae sedis | | Sebastes phillipsi (Fitch, 1964) | chameleon rockfish | Monterey Bay to Newport Beach in southern California, US |
| Incertae sedis | | Sebastes polyspinis (Taranetz & Moiseev, 1933) | northern rockfish | North Pacific |
| Incertae sedis | | Sebastes reedi (Westrheim & Tsuyuki, 1967) | yellowmouth rockfish | Eastern Pacific |
| Sebastodes Gill, 1861 | | Sebastes goodei (C. H. Eigenmann & R. S. Eigenmann, 1890) | chilipepper rockfish | Western North America from Baja California to Vancouver |
| Sebastodes Gill, 1861 | | Sebastes itinus (D. S. Jordan & Starks, 1904) | | Japan |
| Sebastodes Gill, 1861 | | Sebastes jordani (C. H. Gilbert, 1896) | shortbelly rockfish | Vancouver Island in British Columbia, Canada to northern Baja California, Mexico |
| Sebastodes Gill, 1861 | | Sebastes paucispinis (Ayres, 1854) | Bocaccio rockfish | Stepovak Bay, Alaska to central Baja California |
| Sebastodes Gill, 1861 | | Sebastes steindachneri (Hilgendorf, 1880) | | Northern Japan to the southern Kuril Islands, the northern Sea of Japan, and the Sea of Okhotsk. Reported from South Korea |
| Sebastichthys Gill, 1862 | | Sebastes nigrocinctus (Ayres, 1859) | tiger rockfish | Pacific Ocean off Kodiak Island, and from Prince William Sound, Alaska, south to Point Buchon, central California |
| Murasoius Matsubara 1943 | | Sebastes nudus (Matsubara, 1943) | | Japan and South Korea |
| Murasoius Matsubara 1943 | | Sebastes pachycephalus (Temminck & Schlegel, 1843) | | Northwest Pacific |
| Takenokius Matsubara, 1943 | | Sebastes oblongus (Günther, 1877) | Bamboo shoot seaperch, Tortoiseshell perch | Japan and South Korea |
| Hatumeus Matsubara, 1943 | | Sebastes owstoni (D. S. Jordan & W. F. Thompson, 1914) | Japanese yellow seaperch | Japan to Primorskii Krai, the Sea of Okhotsk, and the North Korea |
| Sebastopyr Jordan & Evermann, 1927 | | Sebastes ruberrimus (Cramer, 1895) | yelloweye rockfish | East Pacific and range from Baja California to Dutch harbor in Alaska |
| | | Sebastes ijimae (D. S. Jordan & Metz, 1913) | | Japan and South Korea |
| Neohispaniscus Matsubara 1943 | | Sebastes schlegelii (Hilgendorf, 1880 ) | Korean rockfish | Northern Asia |
| Neohispaniscus Matsubara 1943 | | Sebastes vulpes (Döderlein (de), 1884) | fox jacopever | Japan and Korea |
| Neohispaniscus Matsubara 1943 | | Sebastes zonatus (L. C. Chen & Barsukov, 1976) | | Japan and South Korea |
| Sebastocarus Jordan & Evermann, 1927 | | Sebastes serriceps (D. S. Jordan & C. H. Gilbert, 1880) | treefish | eastern Pacific Ocean with a range from San Francisco, California to central Baja California, Mexico |

== Characteristics ==
Sebastes species have bodies which vary from elongate to deep, and which may be moderately to highly compressed with a comparatively large head. Their eyes vary from large to small. They may have spines on the head or these may be absent, if spines are present, these can be small and weak or robust and there can be up to 8 of them. They lack a spiny horizontal ridge below the eye. The jaws have many small conical teeth and there are teeth on the roof of the mouth. The single dorsal fin is typically strongly incised at the posterior of the spiny portion which contains 12–15 robust, venom-bearing spines and to the rear of these are 9–16 soft rays, The anal fin has 2–4 spines and 6 to 11 soft rays. There is a spine in each of the pelvic fins as well as 5 soft rays and these are placed under the pectoral fins. The pectoral fins are large and may be rounded or pointed in shape with 14–22 soft rays, the longest being the central rays. The caudal fin is straight to slightly concave. The lateral line may have pored or tubed scales. They vary in size from a maximum total length of 13.7 cm (5.4 in) in S. koreanus to 108 cm (43 in) in S. borealis.

== Distribution ==
Sebastes rockfish are found in the temperate North and South Pacific and Atlantic Oceans. Rockfish range from the intertidal zone to almost 3,000 m (9,800 ft) deep, usually living benthically on various substrates, often, as the name suggests, around rock outcrops.

== Biology ==
Sebastes rockfish may be long-lived, amongst the longest-living fish on earth, with several species known to surpass 100 years of age, and a maximum reported age of 205 years for S. aleutianus.

== Ecotoxicology, radioecology ==
Like all carnivores, these fish can bioaccumulate some pollutants or radionuclides such as cesium. Highly radioactive rockfish have been caught in a port near Fukushima city, Japan, not far from the Fukushima Daiichi Nuclear Power Plant, nearly 2 years after the nuclear disaster (ex: 107000 Bq/kg (2013-02-12); 116000 Bq/kg (2013-02-13) and 132000 Bq/kg (2013-02-13), respectively 1070, 1160, and 1320 times more than the maximum allowed by Japanese authorities (as updated on April 1, 2012)

== Fisheries ==
Sebastes rockfish are important sport and commercial fish, and many species have been overfished. As a result, seasons are tightly controlled in many areas. Sebastes species are sometimes fraudulently substituted for the more expensive northern red snapper (Lutjanus campechanus).
