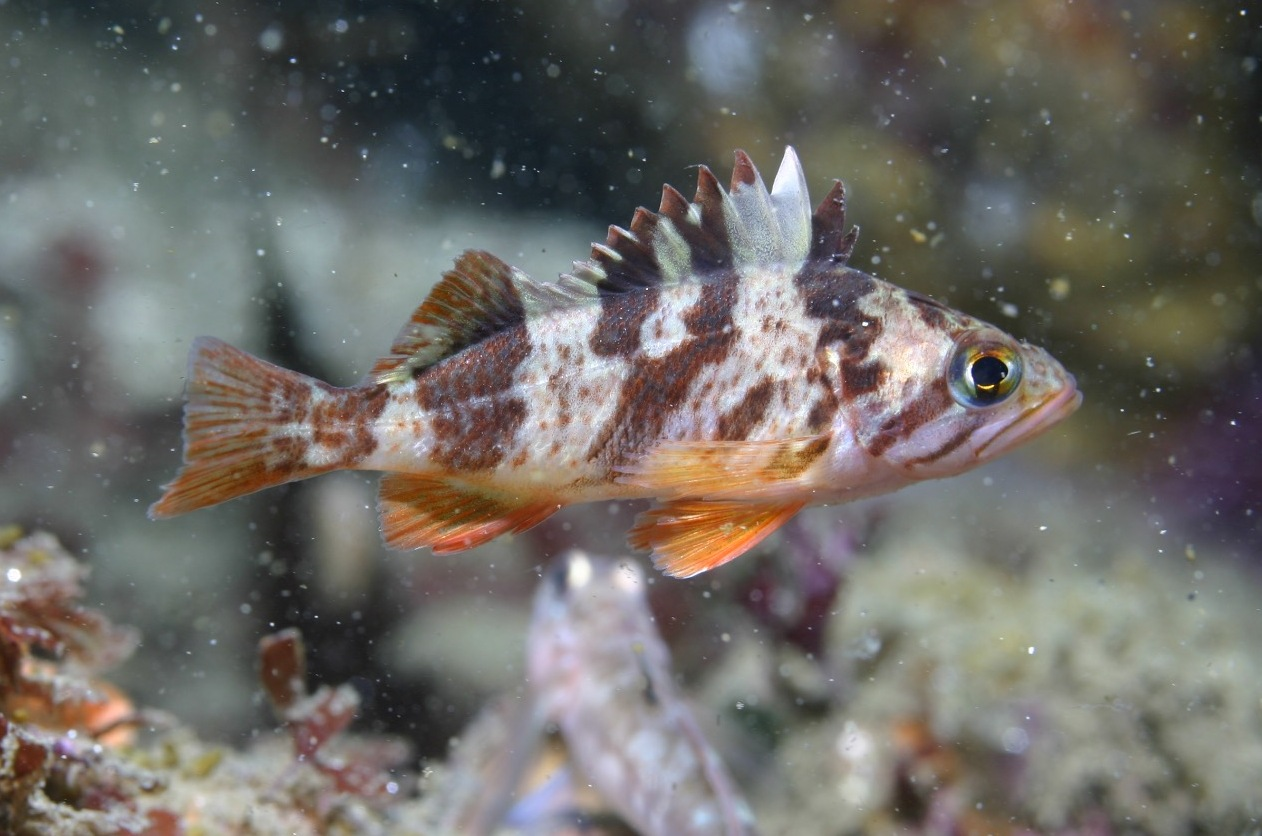

Scientific classification
- Kingdom: Animalia
- Phylum: Chordata
- Class: Actinopterygii
- Order: Perciformes
- Family: Scorpaenidae
- Genus: Sebastes
- Species: S. dallii

Binomial name
- Sebastes dallii (C. H. Eigenmann & Beeson, 1894)

Synonyms
- Pteropodus dallii Eigenmann & Beeson, 1894

= Sebastes dallii =

Species of fish

Sebastes dallii, the calico rockfish, is a species of marine ray-finned fish belonging to the subfamily Sebastinae, the rockfishes, part of the family Scorpaenidae. It is found in the Eastern Central Pacific Ocean. It may also be known as the algodón in spanish.

== Taxonomy and etymology ==
Sebastes dallii was first formally described as Pteropodus dallii in 1894 by the American ichthyologists Carl H. Eigenmann and the clacissicist Charles H. Beeson with the type locality given as San Francisco, California. Some authorities place this species in the subgenus Auctospina. The specific name honors the malacologist and explorer William Healey Dall of the Smithsonian Institution.

== Description ==
Sebastes dallii has a body which is oval, elongated, and rather broad. The depth of the body is 32% to 36% of its standard length. The body is covered in scales. The head has a sharp snout, large eyes and a large, terminally positioned large mouth. There are 12-14 spines and 12-14 soft rays in the dorsal fin while the anal fin has 3 spines and 6-7 soft rays.The overall colour is greenish-yellow with diagonal reddish-brown bars on the flanks. In living fish there is mottled brown spotting which rapidly fades after death. The caudal fin rays are dark brown. The anal and pelvic fins are transparent, tinged with red, and the caudal and dorsal fins are dark while the pectoral fins are orange and red.

They are one of the smallest species of rockfish, reaching a max size of 25 cm (9.8 in) and 0.5 kg (1.1 lb).

== Distribution and habitat ==
Sebastes dallii Is found in the central eastern Pacific along the west coast of North America between San Francisco, California to Punta Rompiente in Baja California Sur. The calico rockfish is a demersal fish which is found at depths Between 18 and 256 m (59 and 840 ft) in area where rocky substrates mix with softer substrates, where there is fine sediment, as well as structured habitats such as natural and man-made reefs.

== Biology and ecology ==
Sebastes dalli is ovoviviparous, fertilization is internal and the larvae remain within the female and receive nutrients from her before she gives birth to them. Females are sexually mature at 9 years old and for males at 7 years old. The breeding season runs from January to May, peaking in February. A female can give birth to between 3,900 and 18,000 larvae in a season. The larvae are planktonic while the juveniles are pelagic. These fishes live for up to 12 years.

Calico rockfish are a carnivorous species which preys on crustaceans, cephalopods, bivalves and smaller fishes. They are preyed on by larger fishes, seals and seabirds.
