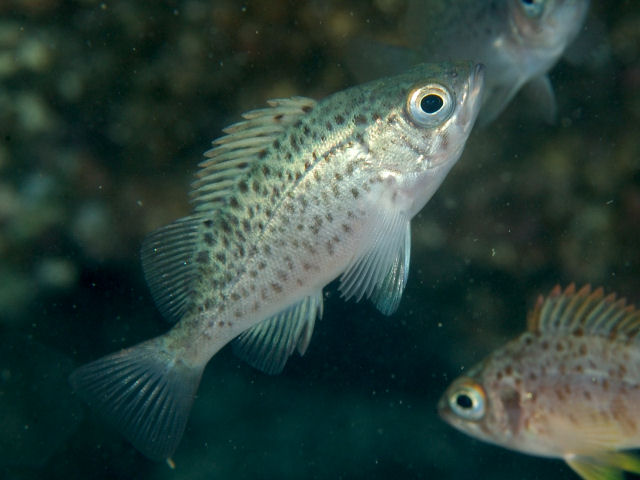

Scientific classification
- Kingdom: Animalia
- Phylum: Chordata
- Class: Actinopterygii
- Order: Perciformes
- Family: Scorpaenidae
- Genus: Sebastes
- Species: S. ventricosus

Binomial name
- Sebastes ventricosus Temminck & Schlegel, 1843

= Sebastes ventricosus =

Species of fish

Sebastes ventricosus, the Japanese black seaperch or Japanese blueback seaperch, is a species of marine ray-finned fish belonging to the subfamily Sebastinae, the rockfishes, part of the family Scorpaenidae. It is found in the northwestern Pacific Ocean. In Japan this species is known as Mebaru(メバル/鮴).

== Taxonomy ==
Sebastes ventricosus was first formally described in 1843 by the zoologists Coenraad Jacob Temminck and Hermann Schlegel with the type locality given as Nagasaki. Together with S. inermis and S. cheni these three taxa form a species complex and have been treated as a single species in the past. Some authorities place this species complex in the subgenus Mebarus. The specific name ventricosus means "potbellied or bulging", an allusion which was not explained by the authors nor is it evident what it refers to, it may be alluding to the rounded nape or possibly the ventral profile which is shown as bulging in the plate accompanying the description.

== Description ==
Sebastes ventricosus is greenish-black on the upper body and dark silver on the lower body. The pectoral-fin has 16 rays, the anal-fin has 7–8 soft rays and there are 43-49 pored scales in the lateral line.

== Distribution and habitat ==
Sebastes ventricosus has been recorded from Iwate and Ishikawa Prefectures south to Kyushu in Japan, and off the southern part of the Korean Peninsula. It is a marine, demersal fish.

== Sea perch fishing ==
Sea perch are very popular seawater game fish highly prized especially by fishermen, because they generally put up a good fight when caught with a hook and line. As sea perch are predatory fish, lure fishing (which use replica baits called lures to imitate live prey) is the predominant form of sport fishing involving sea perch, although traditional bait fishing techniques using floats and/or sinkers (particularly with moving live baits such as baitfish, krill or shrimp) are also successful.

It is recommended that when fishing for sea perch, that the fisher(s) should use line in the 1–5 lb test for sea perch. It is also recommended to use a hook size 8-5 for sea perch of all kind. Sea perch, tend to like ragworms, minnows, or cut bait.
