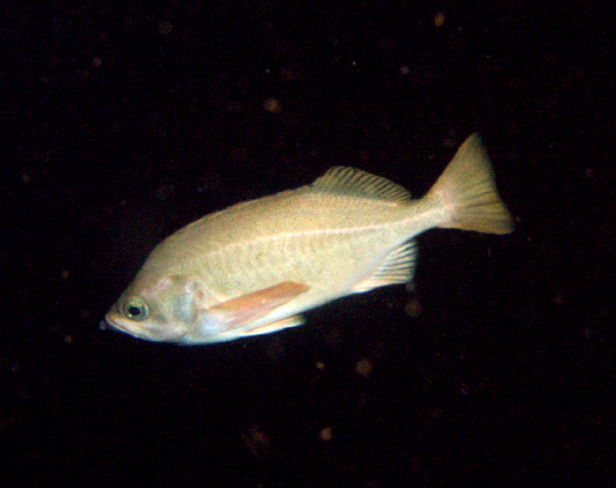

Scientific classification
- Kingdom: Animalia
- Phylum: Chordata
- Class: Actinopterygii
- Division: Teleostei
- Order: Perciformes
- Family: Scorpaenidae
- Genus: Sebastes
- Species: S. ovalis

Binomial name
- Sebastes ovalis (Ayres, 1862)

Synonyms
- Sebastodes ovalis Ayres, 1862

= Sebastes ovalis =

Species of fish

Sebastes ovalis, the speckled rockfish, is a species of marine ray-finned fish belonging to the subfamily Sebastinae, the rockfishes, part of the family Scorpaenidae. It is found in deep rocky areas of the Eastern Pacific.

== Taxonomy ==
Sebastes ovalis was first formally described as Sebastodes ovalis in 1862 by the American ichthyologist William Orville Ayres with the type locality given as San Francisco, California. Some authorities place this species in the subgenus Acutomentum, of which it is the type species. The specific name ovalis means "oval", a reference to the deep, oval shape of this species.

== Description ==
Sebastes ovalis has an oval-shaped elongated laterally compressed body which has a depth of 28% to 32% of its standard length. There are 13 spines and 13 to 16 soft rays in the dorsal fin while the anal fin has 3 spines and 7 or 8 soft rays. This species grows to a maximum total length of 56 cm (22 in) and a maximum published weight of 950 g (34 oz). They are orange-brown or tan on the upper body and yellow-tan on the underside. The tips of the jaws and the membranes of the anal and pelvic fins are black. The body is covered in small black spots.

== Distribution and habitat ==
Sebastes ovalis is found as far south as Cedros Island, Baja California north to San Francisco, California. This demersal species is found in many habitats including extensive boulder fields, area of complex relief and cobblestones at depths between 30 and 365 m (98 and 1,198 ft).

== Biology ==
Sebastes ovalis occur in mixed aggregations with congeners such as the bocaccio (S. paucispinis), pygmy rockfish (S. wilsoni), squarespot rockfish (S. hopkinsi) and widow rockfish (S. entomelas). They feed on nectonic organism like copepods, krill, and other zooplankton. They are a prey species for chinook salmon (Oncorhynchus tshawytscha). Like other rockfishes the speckled rockfish is an ovoviviparous species which extrudes live larvae and each female bears between 61,000 and 160,000 oocytes in their ovaries each year. They live for at least 37 years.
