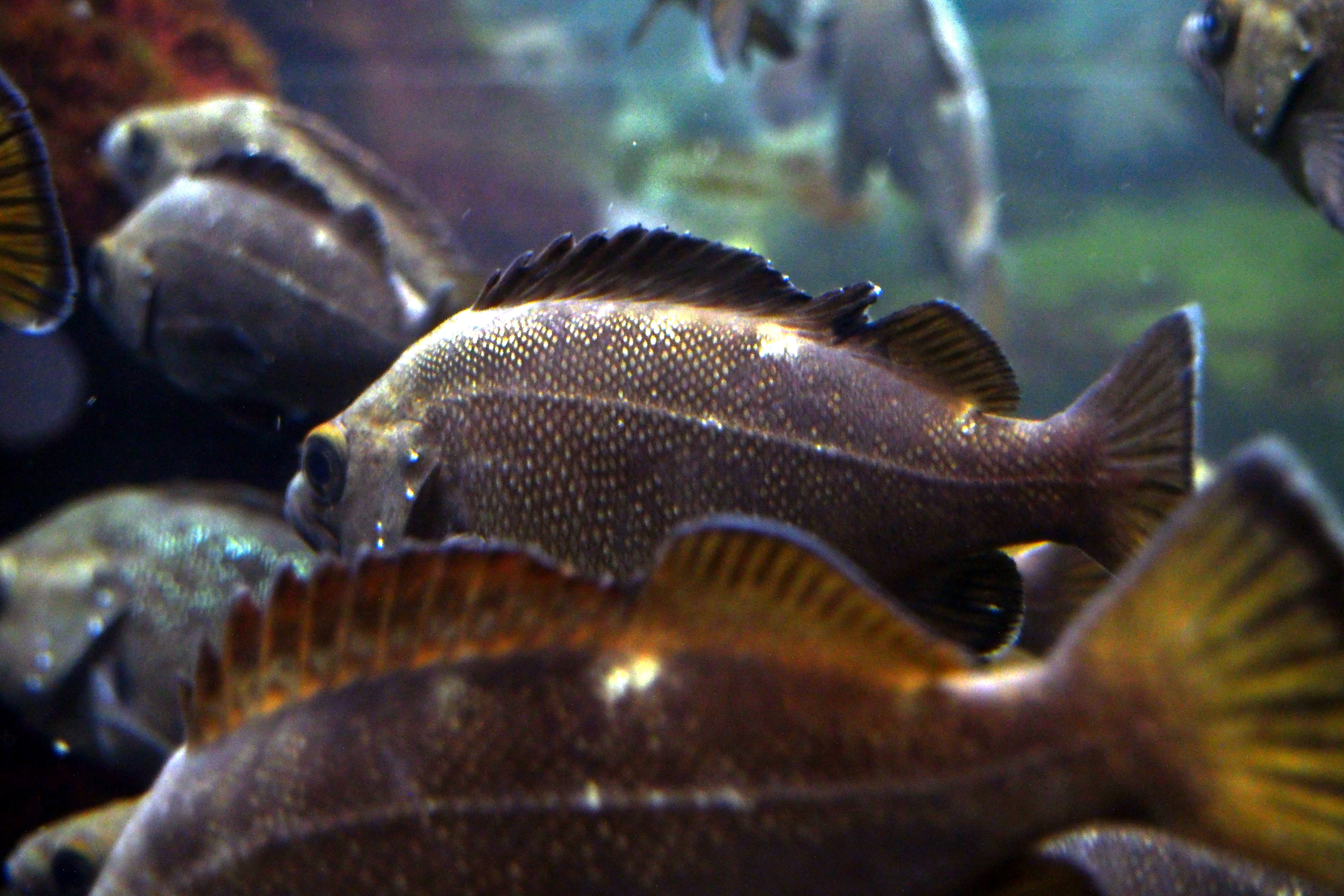

Scientific classification
- Kingdom: Animalia
- Phylum: Chordata
- Class: Actinopterygii
- Order: Perciformes
- Family: Scorpaenidae
- Genus: Sebastes
- Species: S. taczanowskii

Binomial name
- Sebastes taczanowskii Steindachner, 1880

= Sebastes taczanowskii =

Species of fish

Sebastes taczanowskii, the white-edged rockfish, or Yezo seaperch is a species of marine ray-finned fish belonging to the subfamily Sebastinae, the rockfishes, part of the family Scorpaenidae. It is native to the northwestern Pacific Ocean from northern Japan and far eastern Russia, it has also been reported from Korea. This species was first formally described in 1880 by the Austrian ichthyologist Franz Steindachner with the type locality given as Northern Japan. The identity of the person honoured in its specific name is not certain but is thought likely to be the Polish zoologist Władysław Taczanowski, who possibly gave Steindachner the type which had been collected by another Polish zoologist, Benedykt Dybowski. Some authorities place this species in the subgenus Mebarus. This demersal fish is found in shallow waters near coasts and will enter estuaries and the juveniles live among floating seaweed. It is an ovoviviparous species. This species attains a maximum total length of 32 cm (13 in).
