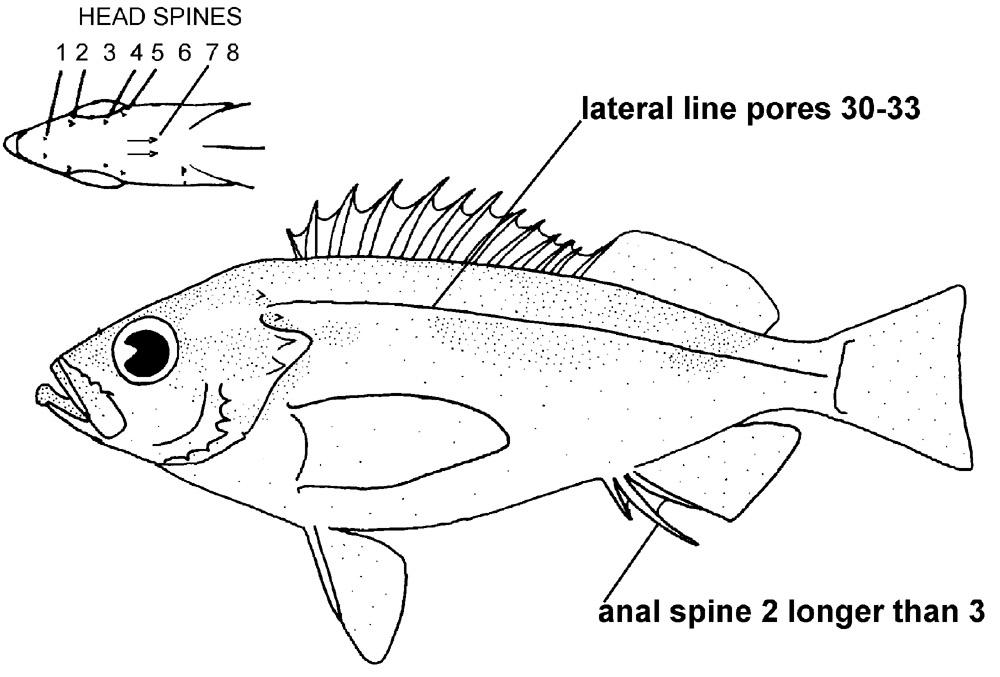

Scientific classification
- Kingdom: Animalia
- Phylum: Chordata
- Class: Actinopterygii
- Order: Perciformes
- Family: Scorpaenidae
- Genus: Sebastes
- Species: S. rufinanus

Binomial name
- Sebastes rufinanus Lea & Fitch, 1972

= Sebastes rufinanus =

Species of fish

Sebastes rufinanus, the dwarf-red rockfish, is a species of marine ray-finned fish belonging to the subfamily Sebastinae, the rockfishes, part of the family Scorpaenidae. It is found in the Eastern Pacific, in tock habitats off islands in southern California.

== Taxonomy ==
Sebastes rufinanus was first formally described in 1972 by Robert N. Lea and John E. Fitch with the type locality given as 1.6 miles southeast of Pyramid Head on San Clemente Island in California. Some authorities place this species in the subgenus Allosebastes. The specific name rufinanus is a compound of rufus meaning "red" and nanus which means "dwarf", an allusion to the red colour and small size of this species.

== Description ==
Sebastes rufunanus has a body colored dusky red dorsally fading to lighter red ventrally with reddish fins and a pale lateral line. The intraorbital space bulges, there are 8 weak spines on the head and the peritoneum is black. The maximum length is 17 cm (6.7 in). The dorsal fin has 13 s[ines and 14 soft rays while the anal fin has 3 spines, the second spine being notably longer than the third and 6 to 8 soft rays.

== Distribution and habitat ==
Sebastes rufinanus is native to the eastern central Pacific, especially around San Clemente Island off the coast of southern California, It is typically found a depth of 3 to 183 m (9.8 to 600.4 ft). where it is one of the four commonest species of rockfish, particularly in complex habitats with high relief.

== Biology ==
Sebastes rufinanus, like other Sebastes species is ovoviviparous. It is a schooling species which can be found in quite large numbers.
