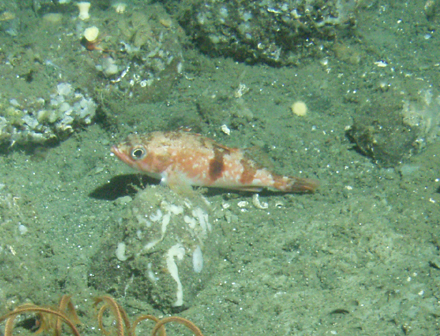

Scientific classification
- Kingdom: Animalia
- Phylum: Chordata
- Class: Actinopterygii
- Order: Perciformes
- Family: Scorpaenidae
- Genus: Sebastes
- Species: S. semicinctus

Binomial name
- Sebastes semicinctus (C. H. Gilbert, 1897)

Synonyms
- Sebastodes semicinctus Gilbert, 1897

= Sebastes semicinctus =

Species of fish

Sebastes semicinctus, the halfbanded rockfish, is a species of marine ray-finned fish belonging to the subfamily Sebastinae, the rockfishes, part of the family Scorpaenidae. It is found in the Eastern Pacific.

== Taxonomy ==
Sebastes semicinctus was first formally described was first formally described as Sebastodes semicinctus in 1897 by the American ichthyologist Charles Henry Gilbert with the type locality given as the Santa Barbara Channel in California. Some authorities place this species in the subgenus Allosebastes. The specific name aemicinctus is a compound of semi meaning "half" and cinctus which means "belt", presumed to be an allussion to the twodark saddle marks extending from the base of the dorsal fin to below the lateral line.

== Description ==
Sebastes semicinctus is a relatively slender-bodied rockfish, its body's depth being between a aquarter and a third of its standard length. The head is long and has a short snout, extremely large eyes and a quite small terminally positioned mouth. The dorsal fin has 13 spines and between 12 and 14 soft rays while the anal fin has 3 spines and 6 to 8 rays. The caudal fin is slightly forked. This is one of the "dwarf" rockfishes attaining a maximum length of 25 cm (9.8 in). This species has 8 weak spines on each side of its head and the space between the eyes is smooth. The overall color is dusky pink on the back, paler silvery pink on the flanks with 2 obvious dark red saddle blotches on the rear half of the body, these darken to brown on the back. The caudal fin has brown streaks and the other fins are pink. There can be a yellow green tint on the back.

== Distribution and habitat ==
Sebastes semicinctus is found in the eastern Pacific Ocean along the western coast of North America between Guerrero Negro in Baja California north to Point Pinos in Monterey County in central California. This species is a demersal fish which is found at depths between 58 and 402 m (190 and 1,319 ft). It is found mainly over flat bottoms with soft substrates.

== Biology ==
Sebastes semicinctus gathers in large midwater aggregation. They are zooplankton feeders and their prey includes amphipods, copepods, crustacean larva, and krill. Like other rockfishes in the genus Sebastes this species is ovoviviparous, the females give birth to a single brood of larvae each year. Each female can bear from 3,400 to just under 31,000 ooctyes which are fertlised internally in early winter with the eyed larvae being extruded in the following spring.
