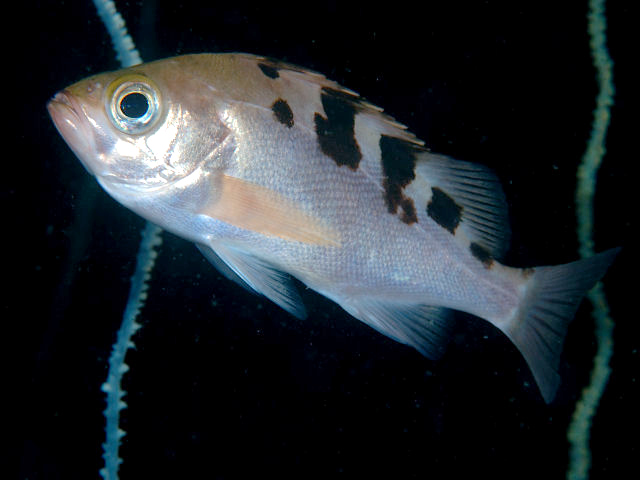

Scientific classification
- Kingdom: Animalia
- Phylum: Chordata
- Class: Actinopterygii
- Order: Perciformes
- Family: Scorpaenidae
- Genus: Sebastes
- Species: S. joyneri

Binomial name
- Sebastes joyneri Günther, 1878

Synonyms
- Sebastodes joyneri (Günther, 1878)

= Sebastes joyneri =

Species of fish

Sebastes joyneri, the Togot seaperch, offshore seaperch or joyner stingfish, is a species of marine ray-finned fish belonging to the subfamily Sebastinae, the rockfishes, part of the family Scorpaenidae. It is found in the northwestern Pacific Ocean.

== Taxonomy ==
Sebastes joyneri was first was first formally described in 1878 by the German-born British ichthyologist Albert Günther with the type locality given as Tokyo. This species closest relatives are S. thompsoni and the S. inermis species complex and these form a monophyletic clade which some authorities treat as the subgenus Mebarus. The specific name honours the British railway construction engineer Henry Batson Joyner, the type of this species was among a collection of fish specimens Joyner collected in Tokyo and subsequently presented to the British Museum Natural History.

== Description ==
Sebastes joyneri is distinguished from the related and sympatric S.thompsoni by having 5 round blotches along the flanks, no marking on the operculum, and 47-53 pored scales in its lateral line. It has a body has a depth equivalent to one third of its standard length with an almost smooth head in which the spines are very small or absent. It has 13 spines and 15 soft rays in the dorsal fin while the anal fin has 3 spines and 7 soft rays. The anal fine spines are longer than the dorsal fin spines.

== Distribution, habitat and biology ==
Sebastes joyneri is found in the northwestern Pacific Ocean in the waters off Japan and South Korea. Little is known of its biology, but similar to other rockfishes, it is ovoviviparous. This species is known to have venom glands within the spines of its fins.
