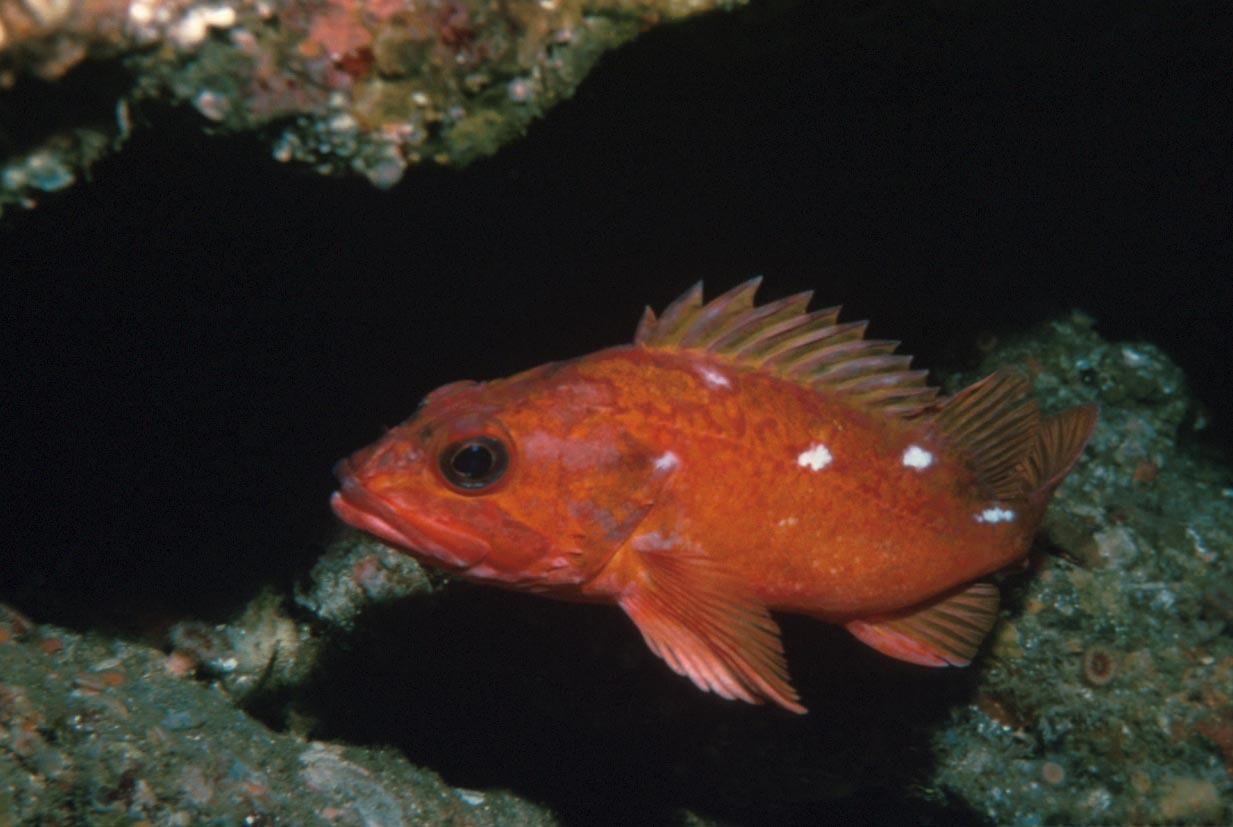

Scientific classification
- Kingdom: Animalia
- Phylum: Chordata
- Class: Actinopterygii
- Order: Perciformes
- Family: Scorpaenidae
- Genus: Sebastes
- Species: S. constellatus

Binomial name
- Sebastes constellatus (Jordan & Gilbert, 1880)

Synonyms
- Sebastichthys constellatus Jordan & Gilbert, 1880

= Starry rockfish =

Species of fish

The starry rockfish (Sebastes constellatus), also known as the spotted corsair, spotted rockfish, chinafish, and red rock cod, is a species of marine ray-finned fish belonging to the subfamily Sebastinae, the rockfishes, part of the family Scorpaenidae. It is found in the Eastern Pacific Ocean.

== Taxonomy and etymology ==
The starry rockfish was first formally described as Sebastichthys constellatus in 1880 by the American ichthyologists David Starr Jordan and Charles Henry Gilbert with the type locality given as the coast of California. Some authorities place this species in the subgenus Sebastomus. The specific name constellatus means "studded with stars” an allusion to the many star-shaped spots on the head and body.

== Description ==
The starry rockfish has a robust, rhombus-shaped body which has a depth of just under a third of its standard length. The body is covered in scales. It has 13–14 spines and 12–14 soft rays in its dorsal fin, while its anal fin has 3 spines and 5–7 soft rays. This species reaches a maximum total length of 46 cm (18 in) and a maximum published weight of 1.0 kg (2.2 lb). Starry rockfish are orange-red in color on the body and fins, darker on their backs with 5 or 6 large white blotches on their upper flanks, and there are numerous small white spots over the upper body too. The head is rounded, more so than its congeners, and is marked with white blotches. Adults are darker than subadults and juveniles.

== Distribution and habitat ==
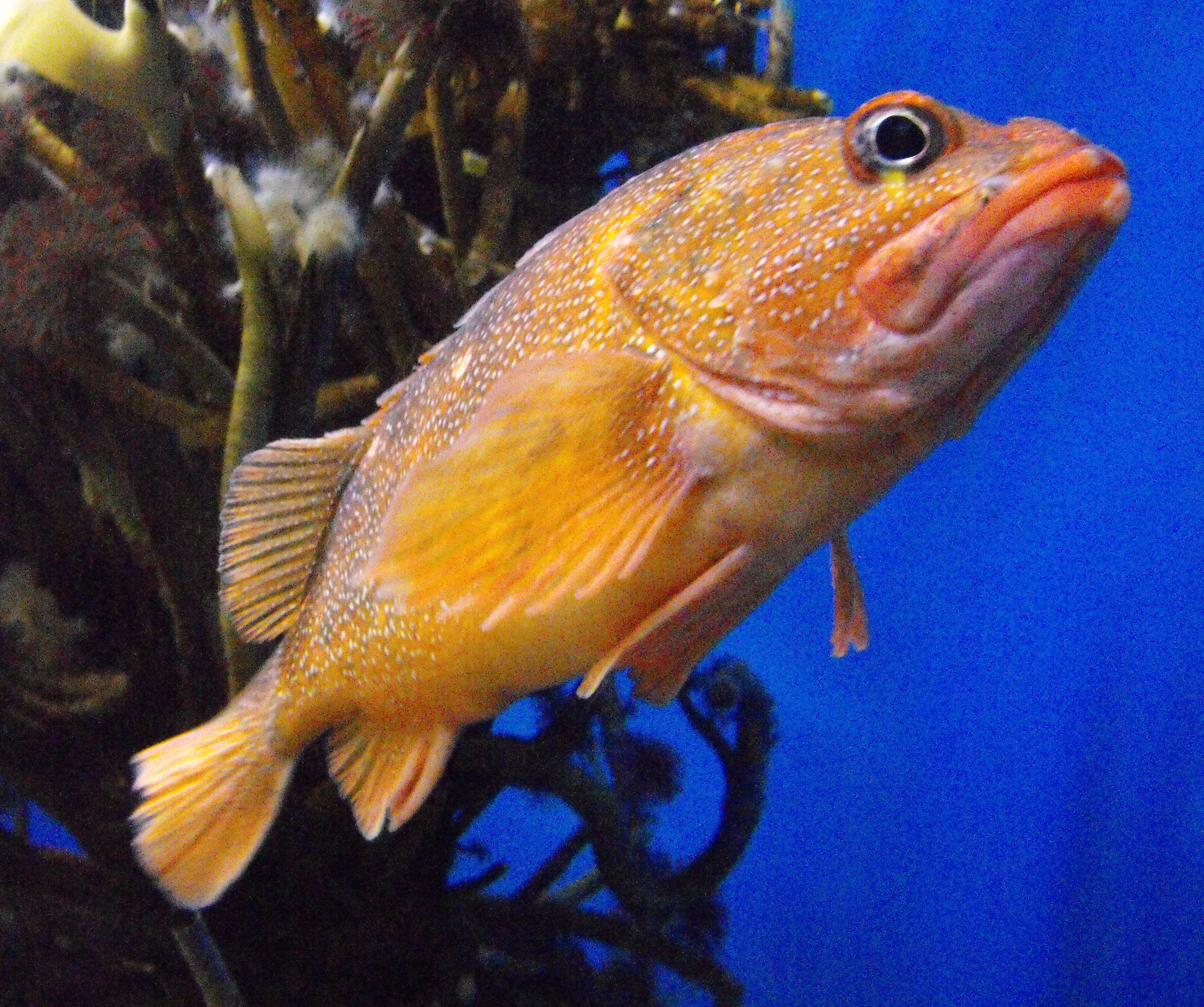
At Birch Aquarium, San Diego

The starry rockfish is found in the Eastern Pacific Ocean off the west coast of North America, from Humboldt County, California in the United States to Todos Santos, Baja California Sur in Mexico. They reach their greatest abundance along the stretch of coast between Central California and Central Baja California. They are found at depths between 24 and 274 m (79 and 899 ft), typically between 60 and 149 m (197 and 489 ft). Adults are associated with deep reefs and are only found over hard substrates, near large boulders or in crevices.

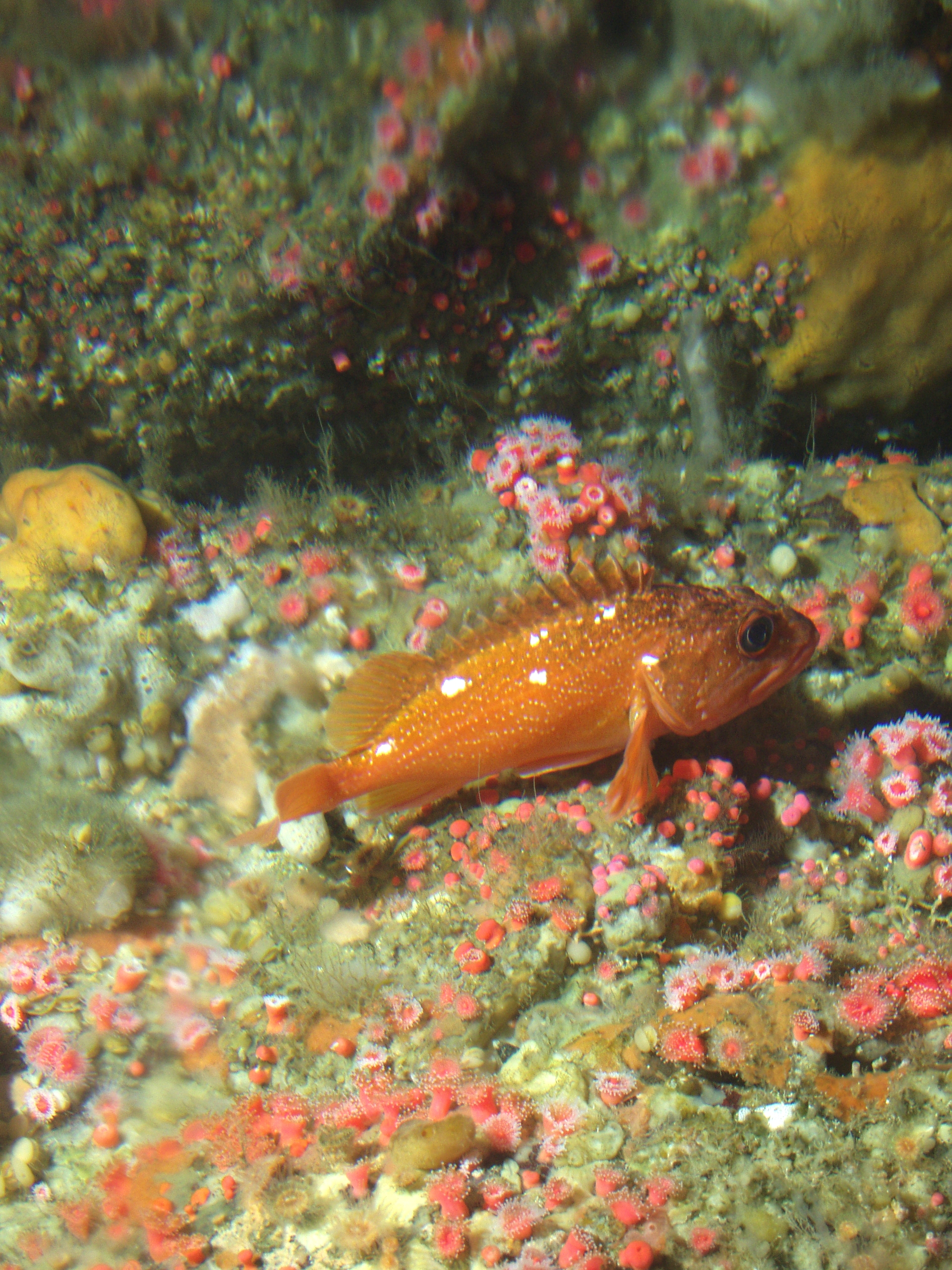
Juvenile on a reef, 90 m (300 ft) deep

== Biology and ecology ==
Starry rockfish are viviparous, and the larvae and juveniles are pelagic. The adults are sedentary and remain in the same area of seabed all their lives. They are predators which prey on fish, krill, octopus, and other marine invertebrates. Females can produce as many as 225,000 eggs in a year. This species may live for up to 32 years. These fishes are preyed on by other fishes, seabirds and marine mammals.

== Fisheries ==
Starry rockfish are not considered to be a target for recreational or commercial fisheries because of their small size, although they are frequently caught as bycatch in fisheries targeting other species.
