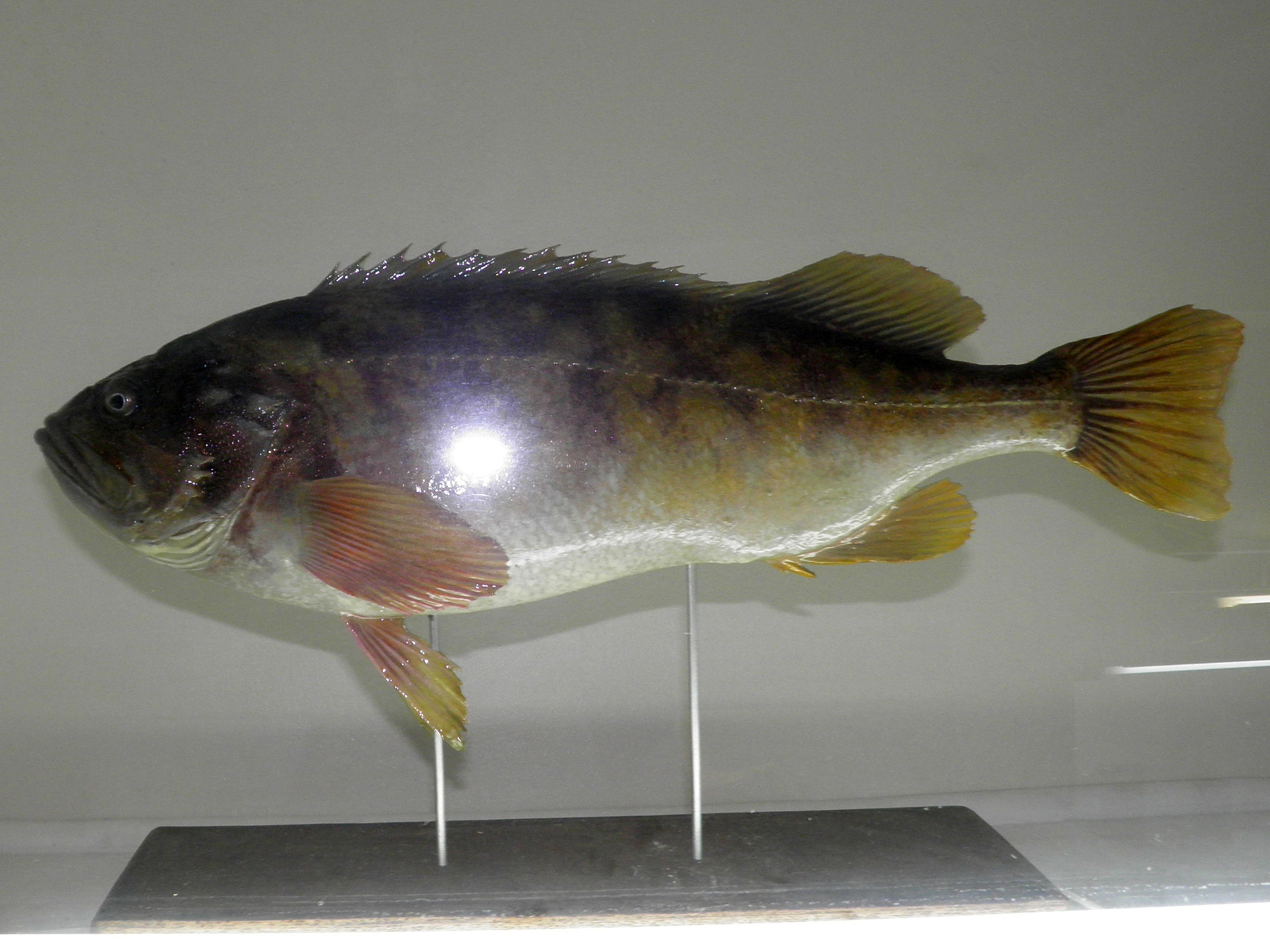

Scientific classification
- Kingdom: Animalia
- Phylum: Chordata
- Class: Actinopterygii
- Order: Perciformes
- Family: Scorpaenidae
- Genus: Sebastes
- Species: S. glaucus

Binomial name
- Sebastes glaucus Hilgendorf, 1880

Synonyms
- Sebastodes glaucus (Hilgendorf, 1880); Emmelas glaucus (Hilgendorf, 1880)

= Sebastes glaucus =

Species of fish

Sebastes glaucus, the gray rockfish or blue rockfish, is a species of marine ray-finned fish belonging to the subfamily Sebastinae, the rockfishes, part of the family Scorpaenidae. This species is found in deep waters of the Northwest Pacific.

== Taxonomy ==
Sebastes glaucus was first formally described in 1880 by the German zoologist and paleontologist Franz Martin Hilgendorf with the type locality given as Hokkaido in Japan. Some authorities place this species in the monotypic subgenus Emmelas. The specific name glaucus means "hoary blue", an allusion which Hilgendorf did not explain but which is thought to be a reference to the grey or blackish body colour.

== Description ==
Sebastes glaucus has a body which is dark grey with a yellow tiny, the yellow is most obvious on the fins. It has a large mouth with the maxilla reaching the rear edge of the orbit. There is a bulge between the eyes which do not bulge above the dorsal profile of the head and the only spines on the head are the nasal spines. There are 14 spines in the dorsal fin. This species attains a maximum total length of 50 cm (20 in).

== Distribution, habitat and biology ==
Sebastes glaucus is found in the northwestern Pacific Ocean. Here it occurs as far south as the Iwate Prefecture in Japan to the Sea of Okhotsk, in the northern Sea of Japan and in the Bering Sea. There are a few records from the Aleutian Islands off Alaska. This species is a demersal fish which is found at depths between 2 and 379 m (6 ft 7 in and 1,243 ft 5 in). Its biology is little known but like other rockfishes it is ovoviviparous.
