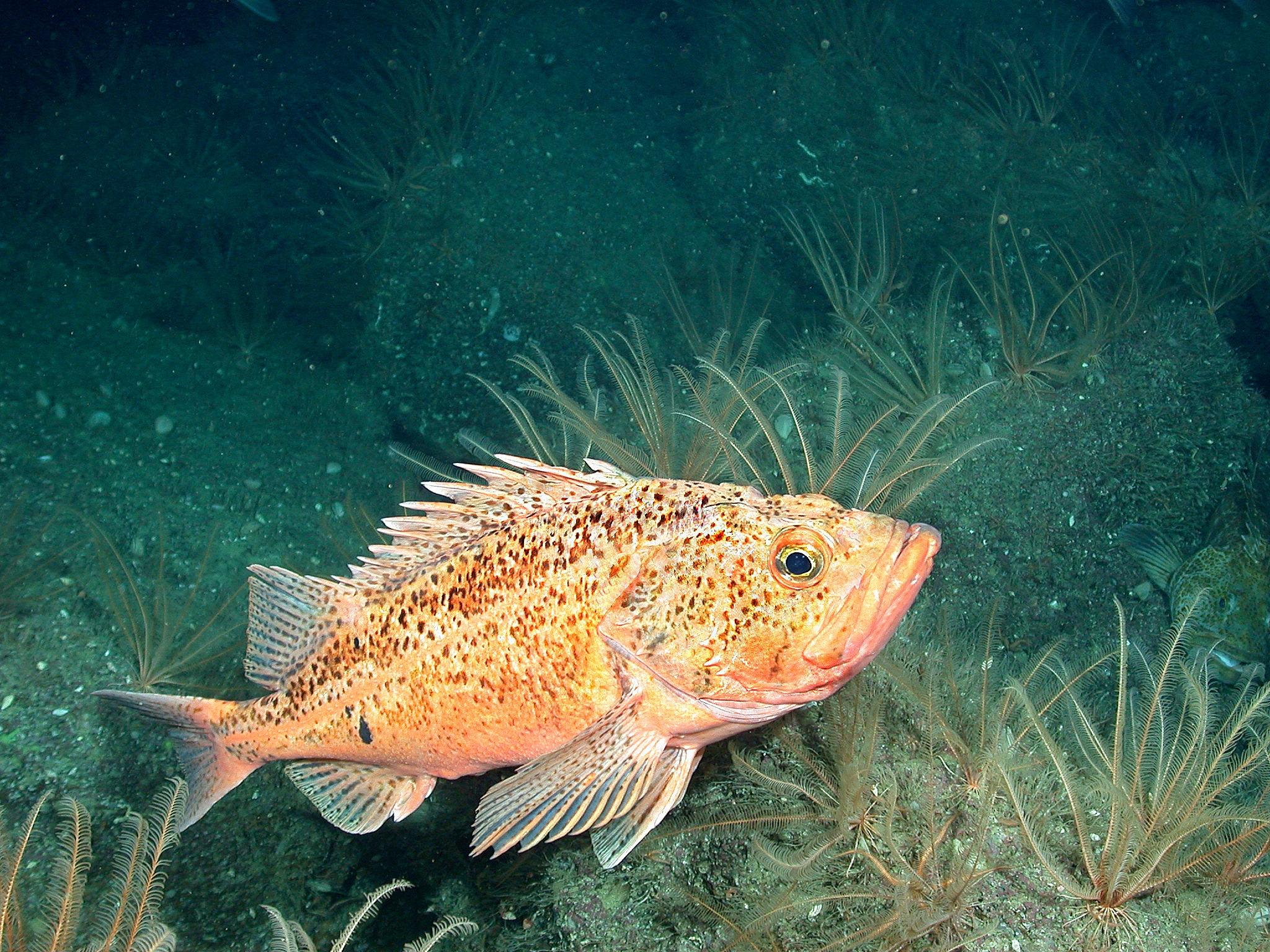

Scientific classification
- Kingdom: Animalia
- Phylum: Chordata
- Class: Actinopterygii
- Order: Perciformes
- Family: Scorpaenidae
- Genus: Sebastes
- Species: S. gilli

Binomial name
- Sebastes gilli (R. S. Eigenmann, 1891)

Synonyms
- Sebastodes gilli R. S. Eigenmann, 1891

= Sebastes gilli =

Species of scorpionfish

Sebastes gilli, the bronzespotted rockfish, is a species of marine ray-finned fish belonging to the family Scorpaenidae, the scorpionfishes, and the subfamily Sebastinae, which includes the rockfishes, rock perches, ocean perches, sea perches and rockcods. This fish is found in the eastern central Pacific Ocean off California and Mexico.

== Taxonomy ==
Sebastes gilli was first formally described as Sebastodes gilli in 1891 by the American ichthyologist Rosa Smith Eigenmann with its type locality given as off Point Loma near San Diego, California. Sebastes is a speciose genus with over 100 species assigned to it and is divided into a number of subgenera. S. gilli, however, is not assigned to a subgenus and is regarded as incertae sedis within Sebastes. The genus Sebastes is the type genus of the subfamily Sebastinae in the scorpionfish family Scorpaneidae which is classified by Eschmeyer's Catalog of Fishes within the suborder Scorpaenoidei of the order Perciformes.

== Etymology ==
Sebastes gilli belongs to the genus Sebastes, this name is derived from the Greek Sebastos which is the equivalent of the Latin Augustus, the Roman Imperial title. This is an allusion to an ancient name, which roughly translated as "august" or "venerable", used on Ibiza for Sebastes norvegicus. The specific name honors the American biologist Theodore Gill of the Smithsonian Institution.

== Description ==
Sebastes gilli is mainly red in color with faint dusky streaks on the back and bronze spots on the back and upper flanks including the dorsal fin base. There are areas of plaer orange color under the soft rayed part of the dorsal fin and the lateral line is pink. There are 3 bronze lines radiating out from the eye, one going downwards the cheek and two to the rear. Younger fish have paler fins which darken as they get older. There are 12 spines and 12 to 15 soft rays in the dorsal fin, while the anal fin# has and 3 spines and between 6 and 8 soft rays. The body is deep with a depth equivalent to 26% to 30% of the standard length, older fish are deeper than the younger fish. The bronzespotted rockfish reaches a total length of 71 cm (28 in) and a maximum published weight of 5 kg (11 lb).

== Distribution and habiata ==
Sebastes gilli is found in the eastern North Pacific Ocean off the coast of western North America from just south of Ensenada in Baja California north to central California. The bronzespotted rockfish inhabits caves and high relief rocky areas at depths between 75 and 413 m (246 and 1,355 ft).
