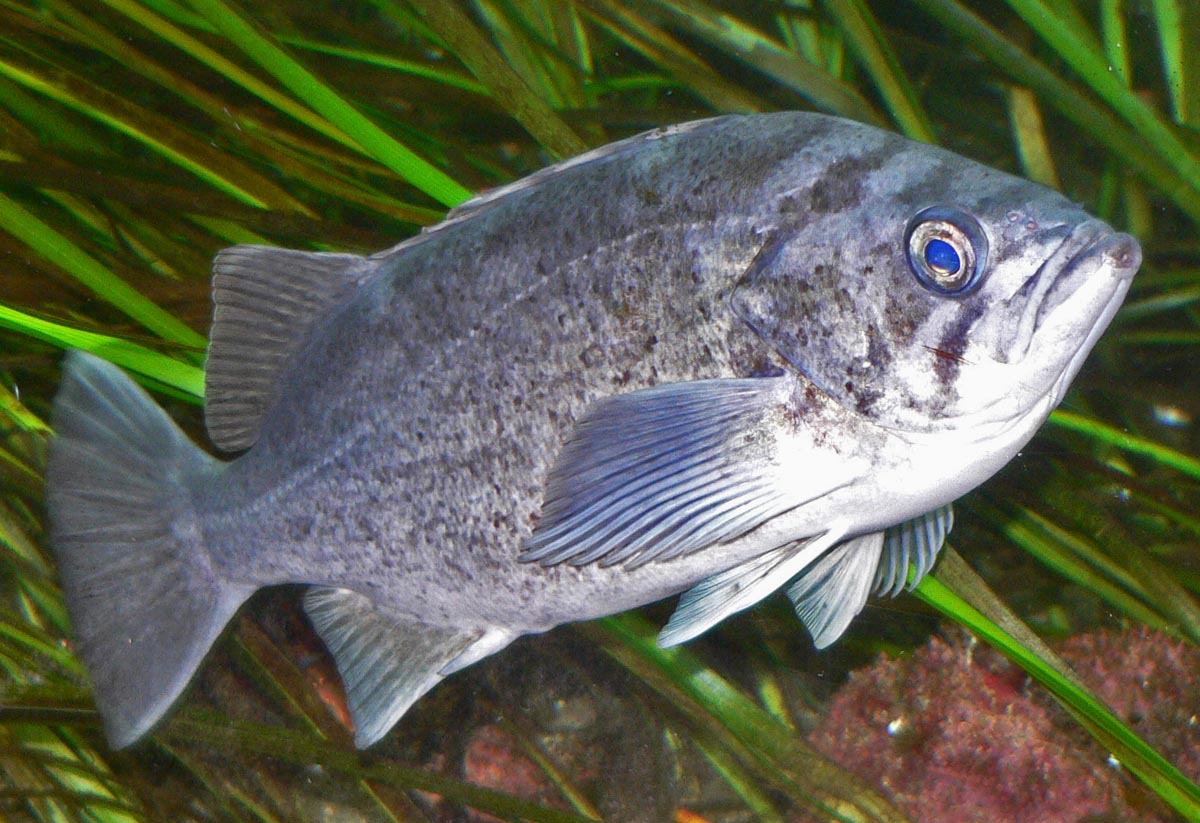

Scientific classification
- Domain: Eukaryota
- Kingdom: Animalia
- Phylum: Chordata
- Class: Actinopterygii
- Order: Perciformes
- Family: Scorpaenidae
- Genus: Sebastes
- Species: S. diaconus

Binomial name
- Sebastes diaconus Frable, D. W. Wagman, Frierson, A. Aguilar & Sidlauskas, 2015

= Sebastes diaconus =

Species of fish

The Deacon Rockfish (Sebastes diaconus) is a marine ray-finned fish belonging to the subfamily Sebastinae, which is part of the family Scorpaenidae. Its body is compressed with large pectoral fins, prominent head ridges, well-developed spines, and large eyes, making it well-adapted for life along rocky substrates-from which its common name is derived. Native to the Eastern Pacific Ocean, Deacon Rockfish ranges from British Columbia to central California where it is found on nearshore and offshore rocky reefs.

== Discovery ==
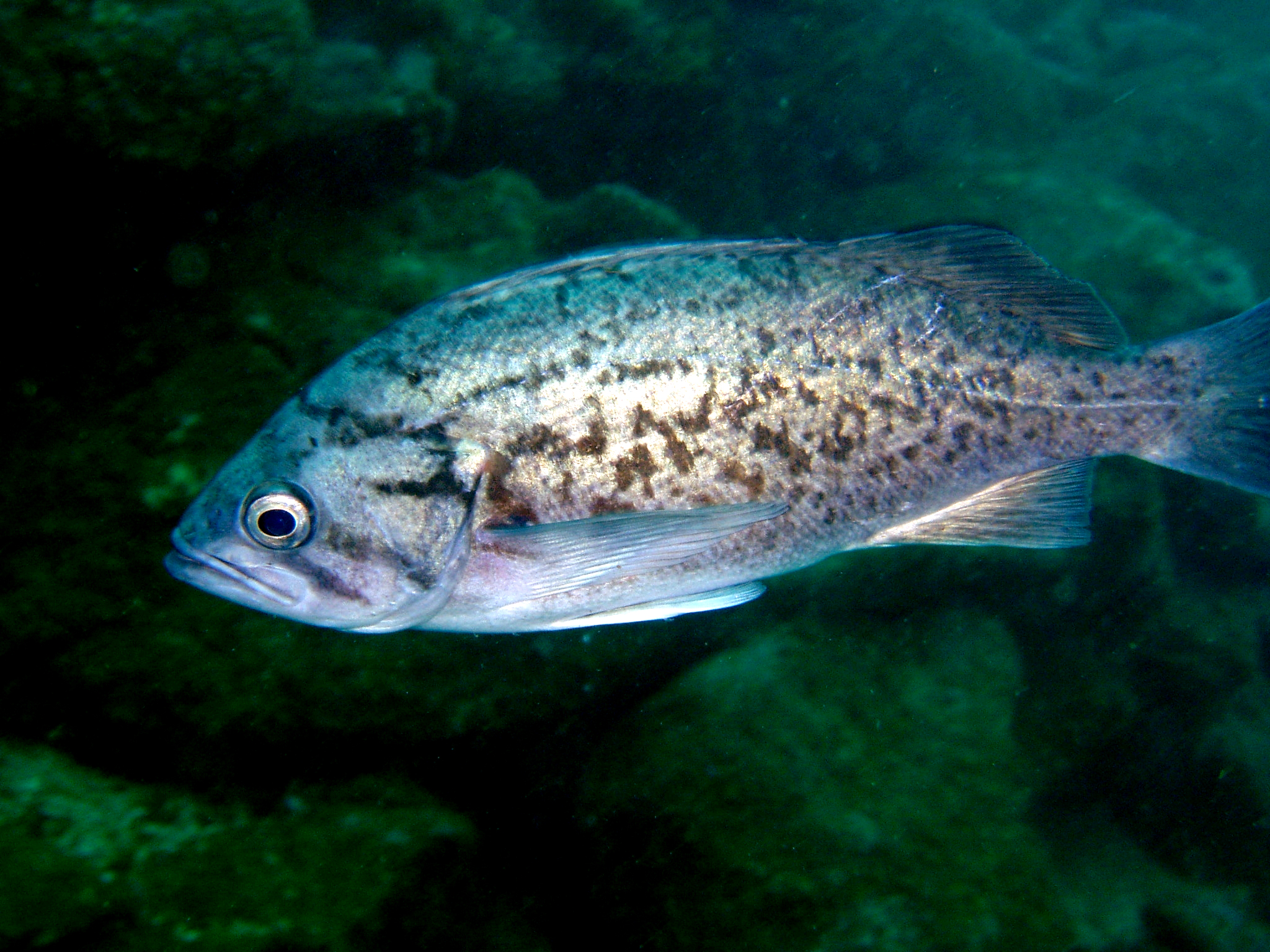
The similar Blue Rockfish, (Sebastes mystinus). Note the distinctive darker blotches on the body, and how the jaws fit perfectly together when the mouth is shut, a good diagnostic feature for this species.

The Deacon Rockfish (Sebastes diaconus) was recognized as a distinct species in 2015 after previously being thought as Blue Rockfish, (Sebastes mystinus). Phylogeographical studies of Blue Rockfish from 2002-2004 revealed the existence of a genetically distinct subpopulation from Cape Mendocino, northern California to Neah Bay, Washington. Additional genetic evidence demonstrated demographic heterogeneity and signs of reproductive isolation, which thus indicated incipient speciation. In 2015 morphological distinctions were found in this northern subpopulation and it was considered a new species, Sebastes diaconus. The deacon rockfish has a lower jaw that extends beyond upper jaw and uniform coloration, while the blue rockfish both jaws meet and have dark blotches along side.

== Etymology ==
The specific epithet diaconus is Latin for 'deacon', which in the Catholic church refers to an 'acolyte', and was an allusion to the specific epithet of the blue rockfish, mystinus, which is Latin for 'priest'. As acolytes and priests often appear similar, so do these two species.[6]

== Description ==
The Deacon Rockfish (Sebastes diaconus) is often treated as a cryptic species, difficult to discern from the closely related Blue Rockfish (Sebastes mystinus). Whereas the Deacon Rockfish has more visible speckles down its body, the Blue Rockfish has a blotchy-coloration along its body. Prior to the classification of the Deacon Rockfish, the former was known as the "blue-sided rockfish," while the latter went by the name "blue-blotched rockfish." Secondly, minute morphological features distinguish them apart in terms of the structure of the mouth and face. Thed Deacon Rockfish has an underbite that is quite noticeable because of the longer lower jaw. Where Deacon Rockfish can live up to 44 years; mature between 4 and 11 years of age, and reach 22 inches in length. Further, studies have shown that minute otolith sagittal-shaped structure differences were there in both males and females; therefore, it was indicating secondary sexual dimorphism.

== Reproduction ==
Rockfish are fertilized internally, but little is known about the specific details of Sebastes diaconus courtship behavior. In general, males are much smaller than females. In this species, females have been found with fertilized eggs from January to February, indicating that there is a defined spawning season. The Deacon Rockfish gives birth just once per year, releasing live larvae, rather than eggs. Deacon Rockfish attain sexual maturity at around 4-11 years depending on the environmental and other factors, so their reproductive cycle is structured and limited to a single annual event.

== Distribution and habitat ==
Deacon Rockfish are distributed on rocky reefs and offshore areas in coastal waters, typically shallower than 180 feet depth, over rocky bottoms with and without kelp beds. This species is often associated with the blue rockfish, sharing the same habitats, in northern California and Oregon. Deacon Rockfish are considered a semi-pelagic species, with adults and larger juveniles may occur throughout the water column. They are generally aggregated into schools, which may occasionally include other species of rockfish.

Female Deacon Rockfish are highly resident and commonly exhibit site fidelity to specific reefs, maintaining small home ranges. They prefer rocky habitats over flat-bottomed regions. Acoustic tagging studies of the Deacon Rockfish in central Oregon have demonstrated that most individuals, while occupying small home ranges over the course of a large number of tagged individuals, drop to the bottom at night and remain nearly immobile. Movements may also depend on daily and seasonal patterns, environmental factors such as hypoxia, or shifts in prey preference for planktonic organisms. This adaptability allows them to optimize foraging strategies and deal with changes in environmental conditions.

== Conservation ==
Deacon Rockfishes are both commercially and recreationally fished in Oregon. In 2017 stock assessments combined Deacon Rockfishes with Blue Rockfish for the purposes of management. These assessments found that California populations of Deacon and Blue Rockfish drastically declined during the 1970's and 1980's but have since recovered close to management targets. Conversely, Oregon landings of Deacon Rockfish often have been above management targets as fishing pressure has been light. Genetic analyses, although nearshore and offshore fish are managed as separate stocks in Oregon, show no significant separation of the two stocks.

Deacon Rockfish occur in the California Current Ecosystem, which provides them with the seasonal upwelling of nutrient-rich waters necessary for ocean productivity. However, the changes in ocean productivity can have some effects on their reproductive success and overall size. Thirdly, they might also be vulnerable to overfishing; although in previous assessments, they had just then been recognized as a separate species. Deacon Rockfishes are covered under the federal Pacific Coast Groundfish Fishery Management Plan, monitored by the Pacific Fishery Management Council or PFMC. Periodic stock assessments have been carried out by the PFMC, and management is cooperated through the Oregon Department of Fish and Wildlife. However, considerable knowledge gaps on the species prevail, and abundance work, species-specific differences from Blue Rockfish, sex-specific growth and mortality, and any information on stock structure would be of great interest for further research.
