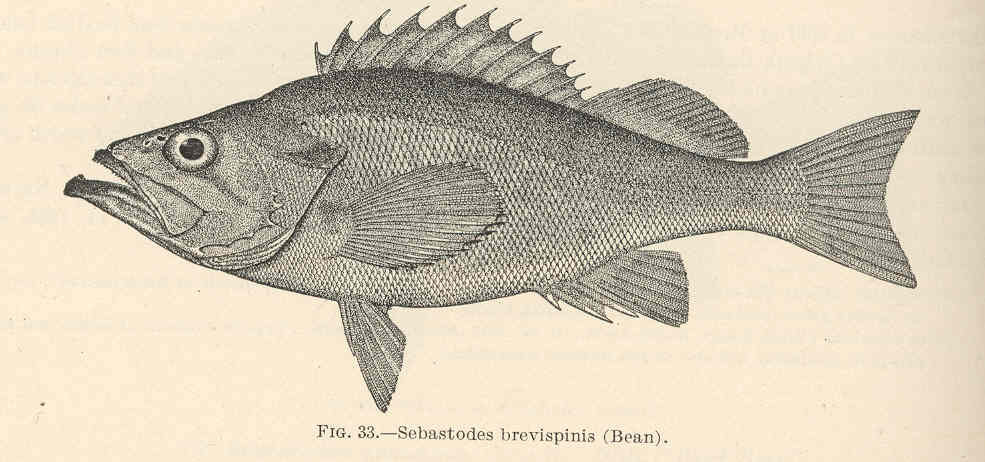
- Image of Sebastodes brevispinis

Scientific classification
- Kingdom: Animalia
- Phylum: Chordata
- Class: Actinopterygii
- Order: Perciformes
- Family: Scorpaenidae
- Genus: Sebastes
- Species: S. brevispinis

Binomial name
- Sebastes brevispinis (Bean, 1884)

= Sebastes brevispinis =

Species of fish

Sebastes brevispinis, or the silvergray rockfish, is a bony fish within the family Scorpaenidae, the rockfishes. It is found off the Pacific coast of North America from the Bering Sea coast of Alaska to Baja California.

== Taxonomy ==
Sebastes brevispinis was first described by the American ichthyologist Tarleton Hoffman Bean in 1884 as Sebastes brevispinis. It is named brevispinis (brevis = short, spinis = spine) for its short anal spines with regard to its body size.

== Description ==
Sebastes brevispinis is a dark charcoal gray dorsally, grading into metallic silver on its sides and a coral pink on its ventrum. the lower portions of their pectoral, anal, and pectoral fins are washed with a pinkish-orange hue. They have a long, projecting lower jaw that extends past their upper jaw.
