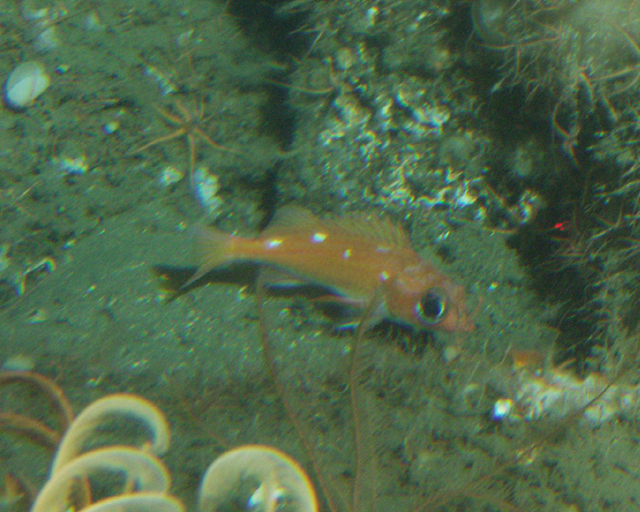

Scientific classification
- Kingdom: Animalia
- Phylum: Chordata
- Class: Actinopterygii
- Order: Perciformes
- Family: Scorpaenidae
- Genus: Sebastes
- Species: S. ensifer

Binomial name
- Sebastes ensifer L. C. Chen, 1971

= Sebastes ensifer =

Species of fish

Sebastes ensifer, the swordspine rockfish, is a species of marine ray-finned fish belonging to the subfamily Sebastinae, the rockfishes, part of the family Scorpaenidae. It is found in the northeastern Pacific Ocean.

== Taxonomy ==
Sebastes ensifer was first formally described in 1971 by the Taiwanese ichthyologist Chen Lo-Chai (also known as Lloyd Chen) with the type locality given as off La Jolla, California. Some authorities classify this species in the subgenus Sebastomus. The specific name ensifer means "sword bearer", a reference to the long second spine of the anal fin.

== Description ==
Sebastes ensifer has a relatively slender body with a depth that is just over a quarter of its standard length. The body has many spines and is covered in scales. The colour varies from bronze to orange, pink, or red. There are 3 to 5 light-coloured spots on the upper body. The long head ends in a moderately long snout and has very large eyes, and a quite large terminally positioned mouth. The anal fin has 3 spines, the second spine is very robust and long, and 5 to 7 soft rays while the dorsal fin has 13 spines and 12 to 14 soft rays. The pectoral fins contain 16 to 18 rays. This species grows to a maximum total length of 30 cm (12 in).

== Distribution and habitat ==
Sebastes ensifer is found in the eastern Pacific Ocean and has a restricted range off the western coast of North America. Its range extends from San Francisco, California south to Guerrero Negroin Baja California Sur. This species is a demersal fish which is found at depths between 70 and 433 m (230 and 1,421 ft). They are found in rocky areas with high relief.

== Biology ==
Sebastes ensifer is ovoviviparous with internal fertilisation and the females release larvae in the winter and early spring. They are batch spawners and will release larvae two or three times in a breeding season, although smaller females may only release a single brood in a season. This species feeds in the water column, feeding largely on planktonic and nektonic crustaceans. They can live as long as 43 years.
