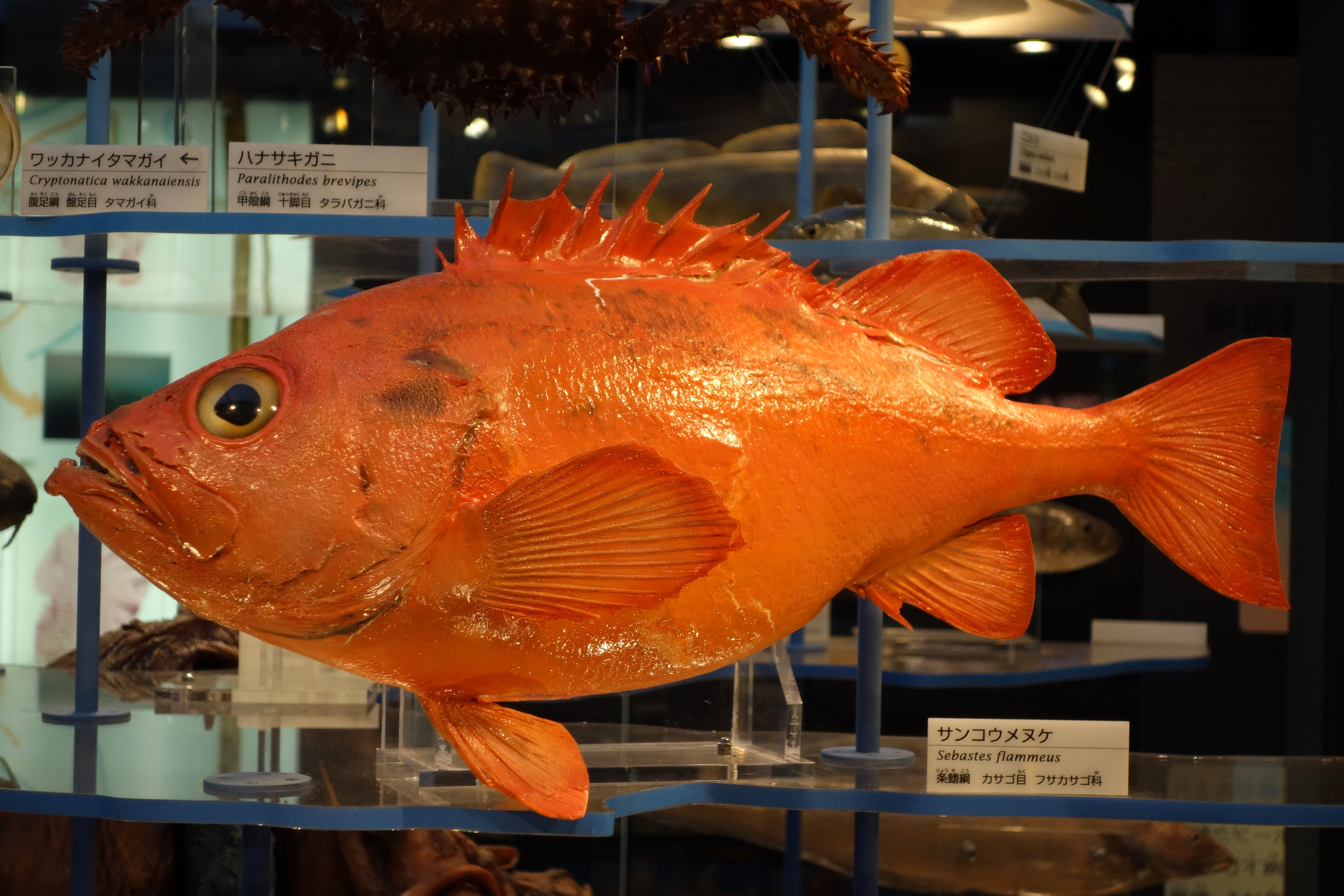

Scientific classification
- Kingdom: Animalia
- Phylum: Chordata
- Class: Actinopterygii
- Order: Perciformes
- Family: Scorpaenidae
- Genus: Sebastes
- Species: S. flammeus

Binomial name
- Sebastes flammeus (Jordan & Starks, 1904)

Synonyms
- Sebastodes flammeus Jordan & Starks, 1904

= Sebastes flammeus =

Species of fish

Sebastes flammeus is a species of fish in the rockfish family found in the northwest Pacific.

== Taxonomy ==
Sebastes flammeus was first formally described in 1904 as Sebastodes flammeus by the American ichthyologists David Starr Jordan and Edwin Chapin Starks with the type locality given as Misaki in Japan. It has been suggested by some studies that this taxon is a junior synonym of S. iracundus. authorities classify this species in the subgenus Acutomentum. The specific name flammeus means "flame red".

== Distribution, habitat and biology ==
Sebastes flammeus is found in the northwestern Pacific Ocean off northern Japan. It is a bathydemersal fish with a depth range of 300 to 500 m (980 to 1,640 ft). It is an ovoviviparous fish which lives near the bottom.
