= Sebastes jordani =

Scientific classification
- Kingdom: Animalia
- Phylum: Chordata
- Class: Actinopterygii
- Order: Perciformes
- Family: Scorpaenidae
- Genus: Sebastes
- Species: S. jordani

Binomial name
- Sebastes jordani (C. H. Gilbert, 1896)

Synonyms
- Sebastodes jordani Gilbert, 1896

Species of fish

Sebastes jordani, or the shortbelly rockfish, is a bony fish within the family Scorpaenidae, the rockfishes. It is found off the Pacific coast of North America from the Gulf of Alaska to Baja California.

== Taxonomy ==
S. jordani was first described by the American ichthyologist Charles Henry Gilbert in 1896 as Sebastodes jordani. It is named after David Starr Jordan, educator and fellow American ichthyologist.

== Description ==
S. jordani is a coppery olive-pink dorsally, grading into a silvery pink on its sides and whitish on its ventrum. Unique among rockfishes, its anus is located halfway between the base of its pelvic fins and the insertion of the anal fin. One of the smaller Sebastes species, it reaches maturity at 14cm and has a maximum length of 32cm. Its maximum reported age is 31 years.
