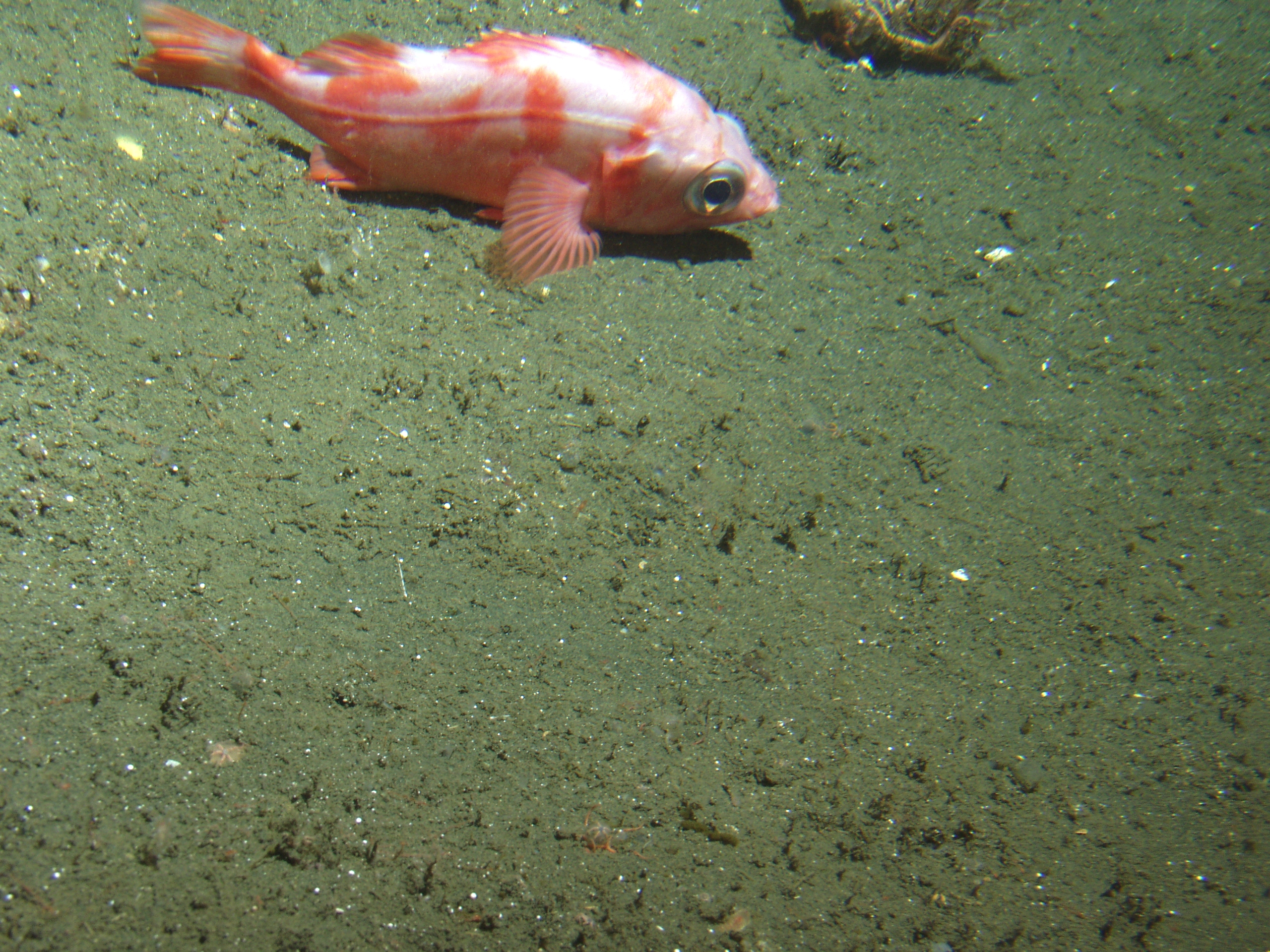

Scientific classification
- Kingdom: Animalia
- Phylum: Chordata
- Class: Actinopterygii
- Order: Perciformes
- Family: Scorpaenidae
- Genus: Sebastes
- Species: S. diploproa

Binomial name
- Sebastes diploproa C. H. Gilbert, 1890

Synonyms
- Sebastichthys diploproa Gilbert, 1890; Sebastodes diploproa (Gilbert, 1890)

= Sebastes diploproa =

Species of fish

Sebastes diploproa, the splitnose rockfish, is a species of marine ray-finned fish belonging to the subfamily Sebastinae, the rockfishes, part of the family Scorpaenidae. It is found in the northeastern Pacific Ocean.

== Taxonomy ==
Sebastes dallii was first formally described as Sebastichthys diploproa in 1890 by the American ichthyologist Charles Henry Gilbert with the type locality given as off Southern California. Some authorities place this species in the subgenus Allosebastes. The specific name diploproa means "double prowed", probably a reference to the tooth bearing knob in the front of each upper jaw forming a deep notch between jaws.

== Description ==
Sebastes diploproa is a relatively small stockfish with a deep body a deep-body and large eyes. Its upper jaw has a distinct incision which separates two tooth-bearing knobs on each side. There are robust spines on the head with the nasal, preocular, postocular, tympanic and parietal spines being present and there are no supraocular, coronal and nuchal spines. The dorsal fin has 13 spines and 11-14 soft rays while the anal fin 3 spines and 5-8 soft rays. The caudal fin is slightly forked. This species attains a maximum total length of 46 cm (18 in) and the maximum published weight of 810 g (29 oz). The adults are light pink, pale orange or white with darker pink, orange or red blotches or bars on the upper body, head and fins. The spines in the dorsal fin may be tipped with white while the membranes between them can have dark edges.

== Distribution and habitat ==
Sebastes diploproa Is found in the eastern Pacific Ocean off the western coast of North America from the Alaska Peninsula south to Cedros Island off Baja California. It occurs at depths between 0 and 800 m (0 and 2,625 ft). The pelagic juveniles live underneath floating mats of kelp at the surface settling on the seabed as adults on soft substrates.

== Biology ==
Sebastes diploproa has a reported maximum age of 86 years old. This is a ovoviviparous species in which fertilisation is internal. The smaller females have a fecundity of around 14,000 eggs, while larger females have up to 255,000 eggs. This species releases larvae throughout the year. The larvae feed on zooplankton and the larger juveniles feed on amphipods caught among the kelp mats. Adults feed on krill, amphipods, copepods, decapods and fishes. The juveniles have been found to have phaeohyphomycosis caused by infection with fungi of the genus Devriesia, the first case discovered of this type of fungi causing disease in animals.

== Fisheries ==
Sebastes diploproa are caught by commercial fisheries in the United States, mainly in deepwater fisheries targeting rockfish species, and other demersal fishes, on the continental slope. In these mixed species landings the rockfishes are not consistently sorted to species, and the catch is estimated by sampling species compositions to mixed rockfish landings in port. 90% of the annual catch is from trawlers and 80% of this catch is landed in California and 10% of splitnose rockfish landed are caught by net or hook and line commercial fisheries. This species is not a frequent target for recreational fishers.
