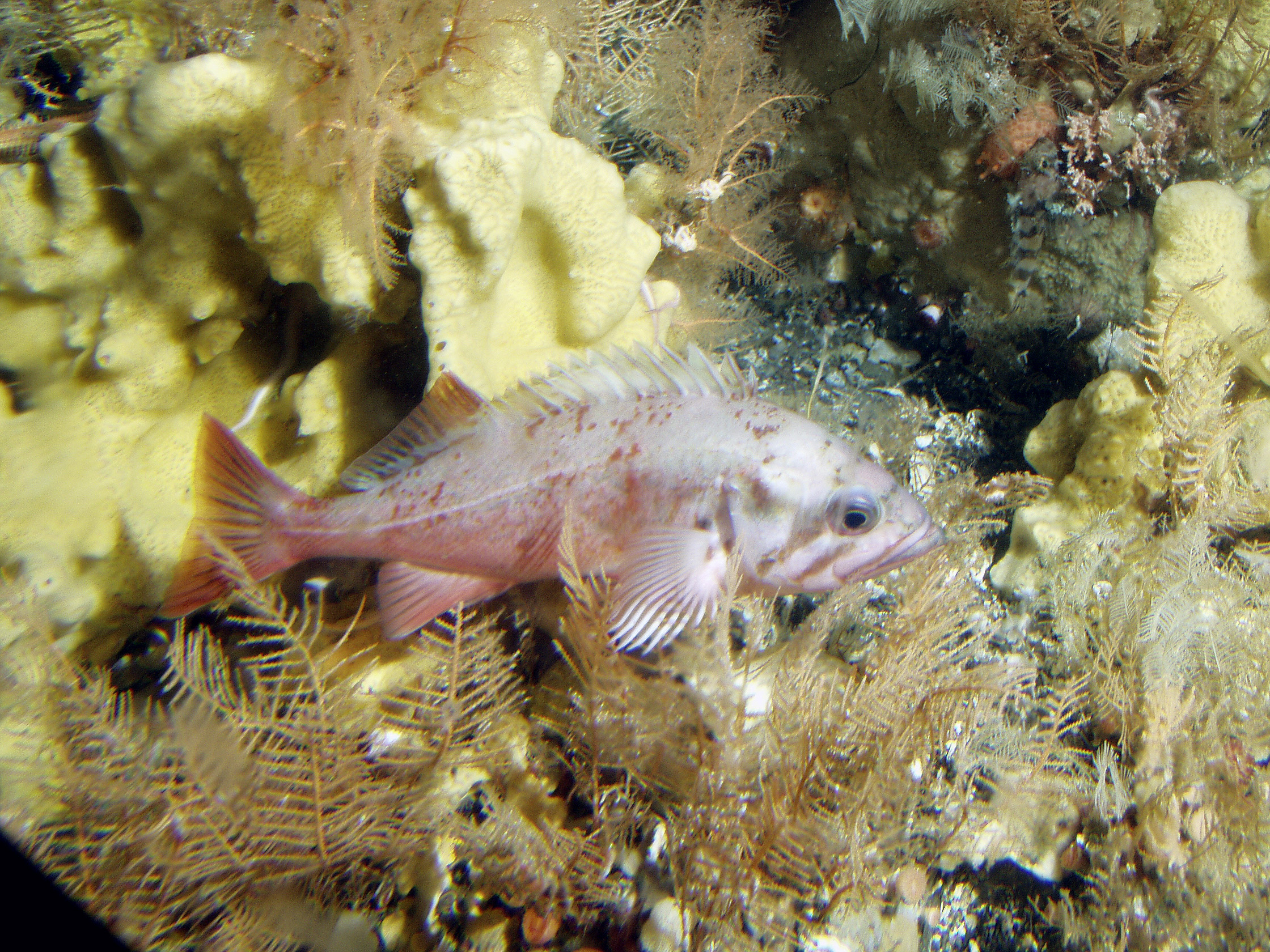

Scientific classification
- Kingdom: Animalia
- Phylum: Chordata
- Class: Actinopterygii
- Order: Perciformes
- Family: Scorpaenidae
- Genus: Sebastes
- Species: S. polyspinis

Binomial name
- Sebastes polyspinis (Taranetz & Moiseev, 1933)

Synonyms
- Sebastodes polyspinis Taranetz & Moiseev, 1933

= Sebastes polyspinis =

Species of fish

Sebastes polyspinis, the northern rockfish, is a species of marine ray-finned fish belonging to the subfamily Sebastinae, the rockfishes, part of the family Scorpaenidae. It is native to the waters of the northern Pacific Ocean.

== Taxonomy ==
Sebastes polyspinius was first formally described as Sebastodes polyspinis in 1933 by the Soviet biologists Anatoly Yakovlevich Taranetz and Peter Alekseevich Moiseev with the type locality given as the Pribilof Islands near Kamchatka in the Bering Sea. The affinities of the Northern rockfish within the genus Sebastes are uncertain and it is classified as incertae sedis within that genus. The specific name polyspinis means "many spined" as with 14 spines in its dorsal fin it has more dorsal spines than its eastern Pacific congeners.

== Description ==
Sebastes polyspinius has 14 spines in the dorsal fin and 3 in the anal fin. The spines on the head are very weak with only the nasal spines always present while the preocular, postocular and parietal spines are normally present while the supraocular, tympanic, coronal and nuchal spines are always absent. The intraorbital space bulges. This species has a dark greyish-green body with reddish-orange on thelower body, they are marked with reddish-orange spots over the head and body. This species attains a maximum total length of 41 cm (16 in).

== Distribution and habitat ==
Sebastes polyspinis has one of the most northerly distribution of the Pacific species of Sebastes rockfishes. It ris found from the northern extermity of British Columbia around the northern Pacific to eastern Kamchatka and the northern Kurile Islands, extendinh north into the eastern Bering Sea. This is a demersal fish which is found at depths down to 740 m (2,430 ft) on soft substrates.

== Biology ==
Sebastes polyspinis is a little known species, Like its congeners it is ovoviviparous and the larvae are born from April. In the Aleutian Islands females the mean number of oocytes is 89,320 oocytes with larger females bearing more eggs than smaller females. Half of the fish are sexually mature 7.6 years at 27.7 cm (10.9 in), younger than those in the Gulf of Alaska. Northern rockfish feed mainly on krill with copepods, hermit crabs, and shrimp forming a minor components of their diet.

== Fisheries ==
Sebastes polyspinis is an impotrtant species for fisheries. It is caught mainly by trawling.
