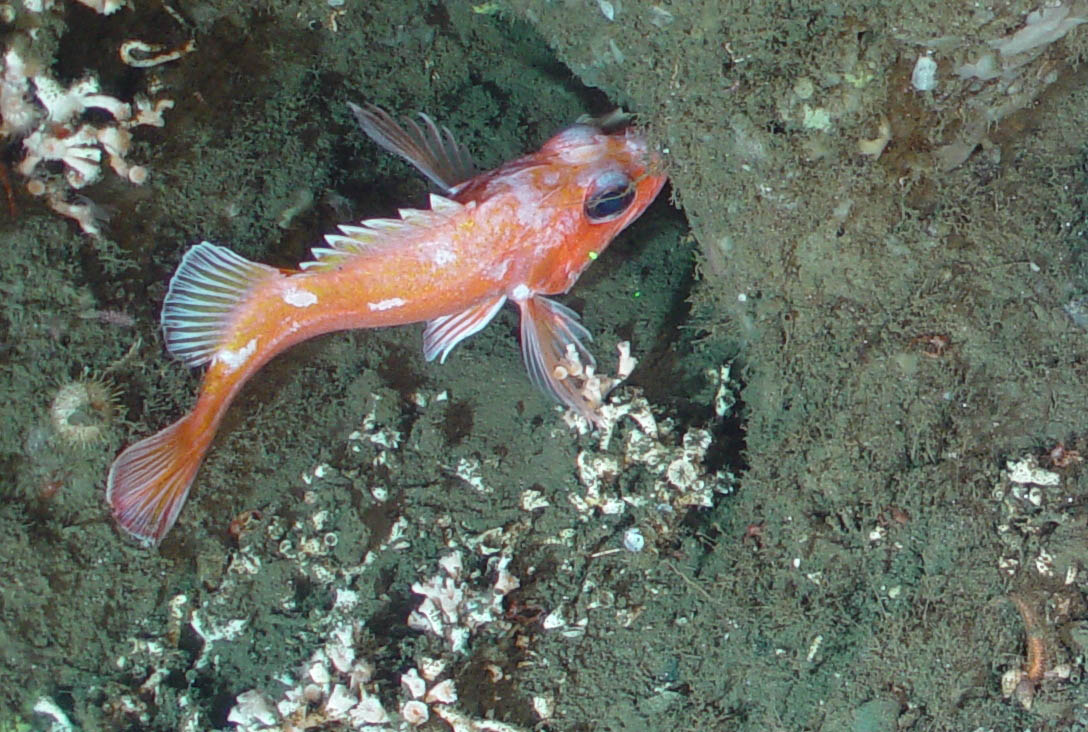

Scientific classification
- Kingdom: Animalia
- Phylum: Chordata
- Class: Actinopterygii
- Order: Perciformes
- Family: Scorpaenidae
- Genus: Sebastes
- Species: S. helvomaculatus

Binomial name
- Sebastes helvomaculatus Ayres, 1859

Synonyms
- Sebastodes helvomaculatus (Ayres, 1859)

= Sebastes helvomaculatus =

Species of fish

Sebastes helvomaculatus, the rosethorn rockfish, is a species of marine ray-finned fish belonging to the subfamily Sebastinae, the rockfishes, part of the family Scorpaenidae. This species is found in the Eastern Pacific.

== Taxonomy ==
Sebastes helvomaculatus was first formally described in 1859 by the American physician and ichthyologist William Orville Ayres with the type locality given as San Francisco, California. Some authorities place this species in the subgenus Sebastomus. The specific name helvomaculatus is a compound of helvus which means "yellow" and maculatus meaning "spotted", an allusion to the oblong spots on the flank, even though these are pink rather than yellow.

== Description ==
Sebastes helvomaculatus is a comparatively small and slender rockfish which has large eyes relative to the size of its head. The depth of the body is just less than a third of its standard length. The dorsal fin has 13 spines and 12-14 soft rays while the anal fin has 3 spines, the second spine being very long, and 6-7 soft rays. The head has robust spines, somne very robust, the nasal, preocular, supraocular, postocular, tympanic and parietal spines are present, the nuchals are typically not present and the coronal spine is always absent. The caudal fin is slightly forked. This species varies in colour from crimson, orange, yellow or yellowish-green patterned as a series of vague stripes. The anal and dorsal fins typically have pink or green stripes and there is green and white striping on the top of the head. There are 4 to 5 white blotches which may be edged or tinted with pale. This species attains a maximum total length of 41 cm (16 in).

== Distribution and habitat ==
Sebastes helvomaculatus is found in the eastern Pacific Ocean from Kodiak Island in Alaska South to Guadalupe Island in Baja California, although it is rare south of San Francisco, California. It is a demersal fish with a depth range of 25 to 549 m (82 to 1,801 ft).

== Biology ==
Sebastes helvomaculatus are typically encountered resting singly in crevices or caves in rock walls or in mud sheltered by boulders or pebbles. It is a slow growing species, It is long lived species which has a maximum known age of 87 years. This species breeds annually, it is ovoviviparous and the females release larvae in May and June.The size at which 50% of the fish were sexually mature was at fork lengths of 228 mm (9.0 in) for males and 208 mm (8.2 in) for females.
