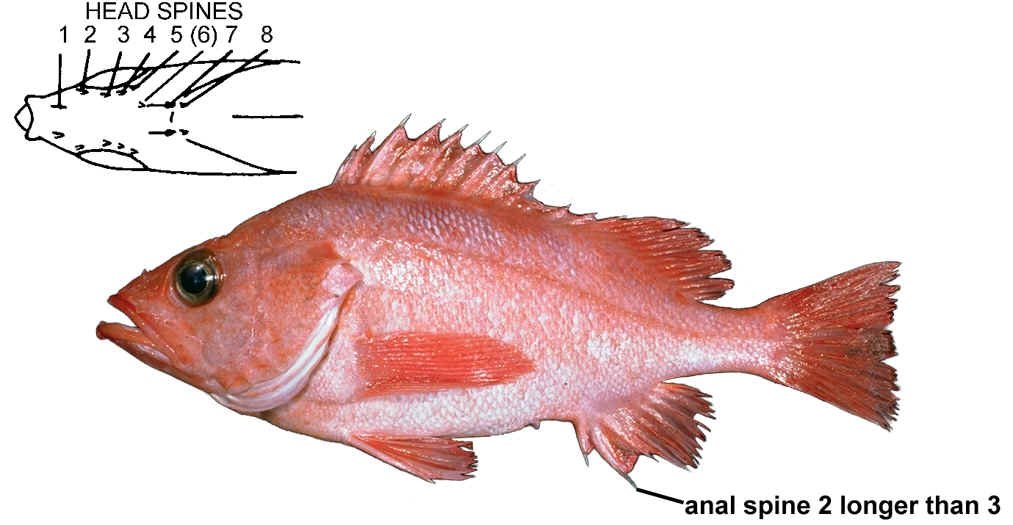

Scientific classification
- Kingdom: Animalia
- Phylum: Chordata
- Class: Actinopterygii
- Division: Teleostei
- Order: Perciformes
- Family: Scorpaenidae
- Genus: Sebastes
- Species: S. aurora

Binomial name
- Sebastes aurora (Gilbert, 1890)

Synonyms
- Sebastichthys aurora Gilbert, 1890; Sebastodes aurora (Gilbert, 1890)

= Sebastes aurora =

Species of fish

Sebastes aurora, the aurora rockfish, is a species of marine ray-finned fish belonging to the subfamily Sebastinae, the rockfishes, part of the family Scorpaenidae. It is found in the northeastern Pacific Ocean.

== Taxonomy ==
Sebastes aurora was first formally described as Sebastichthys aurora in 1890 by the American ichthyologist Charles Henry Gilbert with the type locality given as Santa Barbara Islands in California. Some authorities place this species in the subgenus Eosebastes. The specific name aurora means "dawn" or "sunrise" thought to be an allusion to the uniform red colour of the body, although it is paler on the lower body.

== Description ==
Sebastes aurora has a deep rhombus-shaped body which is 36–40% as deep as its standard length and is covered in scales. There are 13 spines and 12–14 soft rays in the dorsal fin. The anal fin contains 3 spines, the second spine being rather long, and 5–6 soft rays. There are robust spines on the head, these are nasal, preocular, supraocular, postocular, tympanic, parietal and nuchal spines but typically there are no coronal spines. There are small lobes protruding from the front part of the upper jaw. The caudal fin is truncate or concave. On capture the overall colour is rose-red to pale pink, but while they are underwater the overall colour is white broken by pale pink to red saddles and blotches on the back with silvery flanks and belly. The aurora rockfish reaches a maximum total length of 41 cm (16 in).

== Distribution and habitat ==
Sebastes aurora is found in the northeastern Pacific Ocean along the western coast of North America from Amphitrite Point on Vancouver Island in British Columbia to Cedros Island in Baja California. This species is a demersal fish occurring over both soft and hard substrates at depths from 82 to 762 m (269 to 2,500 ft). In 2009 a specimen was collected in Alaskan waters in the Gulf of Alaska, a northward range extension of 225 km (140 mi).

== Biology ==
Sebastes aurora prey on fish, krill, octopus and a diversity of other small marine organisms. This is a long-lived species which has been estimated to have a lifespan of up to 125 years. The estimated length and age at which 50% of the fish are sexually mature is 25.5 cm (10.0 in) and 12.56 years. The peak time for parturition is in May. It is a viviparous species and the larvae are planktonic while the juveniles are pelagic.

== Fisheries ==
Sebastes aurora is a minor component of commercial fisheries in southern California where most are taken using gill nets with a small amount caught annually by recreational anglers. The flesh is considered to be highly palatable.
