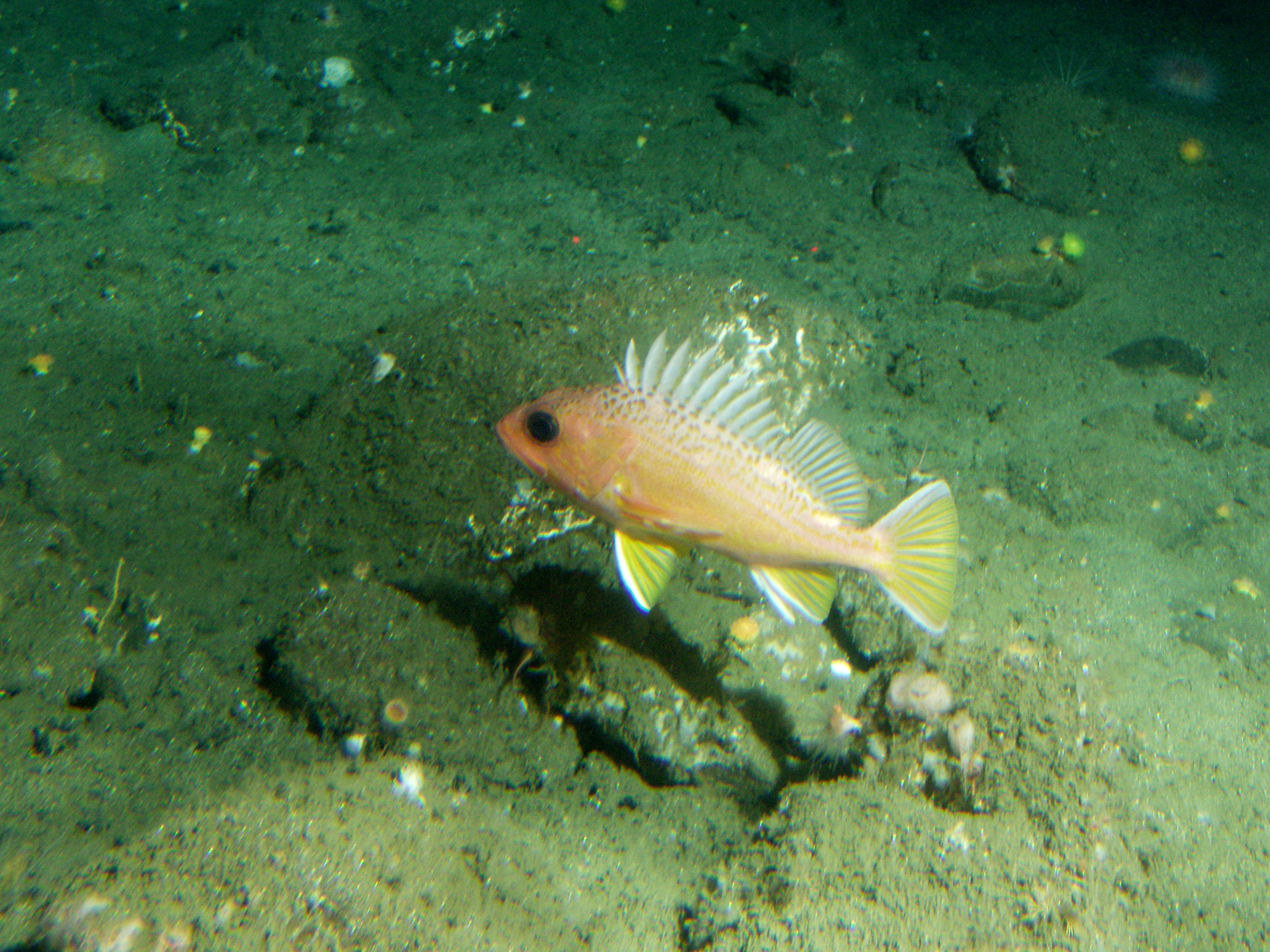

Scientific classification
- Kingdom: Animalia
- Phylum: Chordata
- Class: Actinopterygii
- Order: Perciformes
- Family: Scorpaenidae
- Genus: Sebastes
- Species: S. chlorostictus

Binomial name
- Sebastes chlorostictus (D. S. Jordan & C. H. Gilbert, 1880)

Synonyms
- Sebastichthys chlorostictus Jordan & Gilbert, 1880

= Sebastes chlorostictus =

Species of fish

Sebastes chlorostictus, the greenspotted rockfish, is a species of marine ray-finned fish belonging to the subfamily Sebastinae, the rockfishes, part of the family Scorpaenidae. It is found in the Eastern Pacific.

== Taxonomy ==
Sebastes chlorostictus was first formally described as Sebastichthys chlorostictus in 1880 by the American ichthyologists David Starr Jordan and Charles Henry Gilbert with the type locality given as Monterey Bay in California, although the type was obtained at a San Francisco fish market. Some authorities place this species in the subgenus Sebastomus. The specific name chlorostictus means "green spotted", a reference to the distinct olive-green spotting on the top of the head, back and upper body.

== Description ==
Sebastes chlorostictus has a broad body with a depth equivalent to 36% to 40% of its standard length. It has a big head, large eyes, a short snout and a mouth that extends to the anterior part of the orbit. The dorsal fin has 12 spines, which have deeply incised membranes between them, and 11-15 soft rays, while the anal fin has 3 spines and 5-7 soft rays. The second anal spine is the longest. It has a yellowish-pink body and fins, marked with vivid green spots on the upper body and sinuous lines on the back and top of head. There are also 3-5 pale blotches on the back. The maximum total length of this species is 50 cm (20 in) and the maximum published weight is 1.0 kg (2.2 lb).

== Distribution and habitat ==
Sebastes chlorostictus is found in the eastern Pacific Ocean along the western coast of North America between Copalis Head in Washington State south to Magdalena Bay in Baja California Sur. This species uses a diversity of habitats including boulder-strewn areas, rock ledges and muddy bottoms. It is found at depths from 61 to 244 m (200 to 801 ft).

== Biology ==
Sebastes chlorostictus is generally a solitary species which spends much of its time close to the substrate. They are predatory and feed largely on invertebrates like crabs and shrimp. They also eat small fish and can live to 33 years old. Off central California the spawning season runs from March to August and each female has a fecundity of 14,000 to 414,000 eggs, larger females bearing more eggs.

== Fisheries and conservation ==
Sebastes chlorostictus is a major quarry species in Californian commercial fisheries, mostly caught using gill nets, hook and line, and trawls. The catch is sold fresh and it is regarded as an excellent food fish. It is also a favoured target fish for recreational anglers. Restrictions on the fishery have been introduced in California as a reduction in the mean size of the fish in the catch indicated that the stock of this sedentary, slow growing, long lived species was being overfished.
