= Sebastes koreanus =

Conservation status
- Data Deficient (IUCN 3.1)

Scientific classification
- Kingdom: Animalia
- Phylum: Chordata
- Class: Actinopterygii
- Order: Perciformes
- Family: Scorpaenidae
- Genus: Sebastes
- Species: S. koreanus

Binomial name
- Sebastes koreanus Kim & Lee, 1994

Synonyms
- Sebastes (Sebastes incertae sedis) koreanus Kim & Lee, 1994

Species of fish

Sebastes koreanus, the Korean rockfish, is a subtropical marine fish distributed in the Northwest Pacific Ocean near South Korea. It usually lives at a depth of around 20 meters. It is demersal and oviparous, like all other rockfishes.
