= Sebastes baramenuke =

Scientific classification
- Kingdom: Animalia
- Phylum: Chordata
- Class: Actinopterygii
- Order: Perciformes
- Family: Scorpaenidae
- Genus: Sebastes
- Species: S. baramenuke

Binomial name
- Sebastes baramenuke (Wakiya, 1917)

Synonyms
- Sebastes (Sebastes) baramenuke

Species of scorpionfish

Sebastes baramenuke, also known as the brickred rockfish, is a species of scorpionfish belonging to the subfamily Sebastinae.

They can grow to a length of 51.7 centimetres (20.4 in).

== Habitat ==
It lives in temperate regions of the Northwest Pacific Ocean in northern Japan and South Korea. This species lives at the bottom of water bodies making it demersal at depths between 100 and 500 metres (330 and 1,640 ft).
