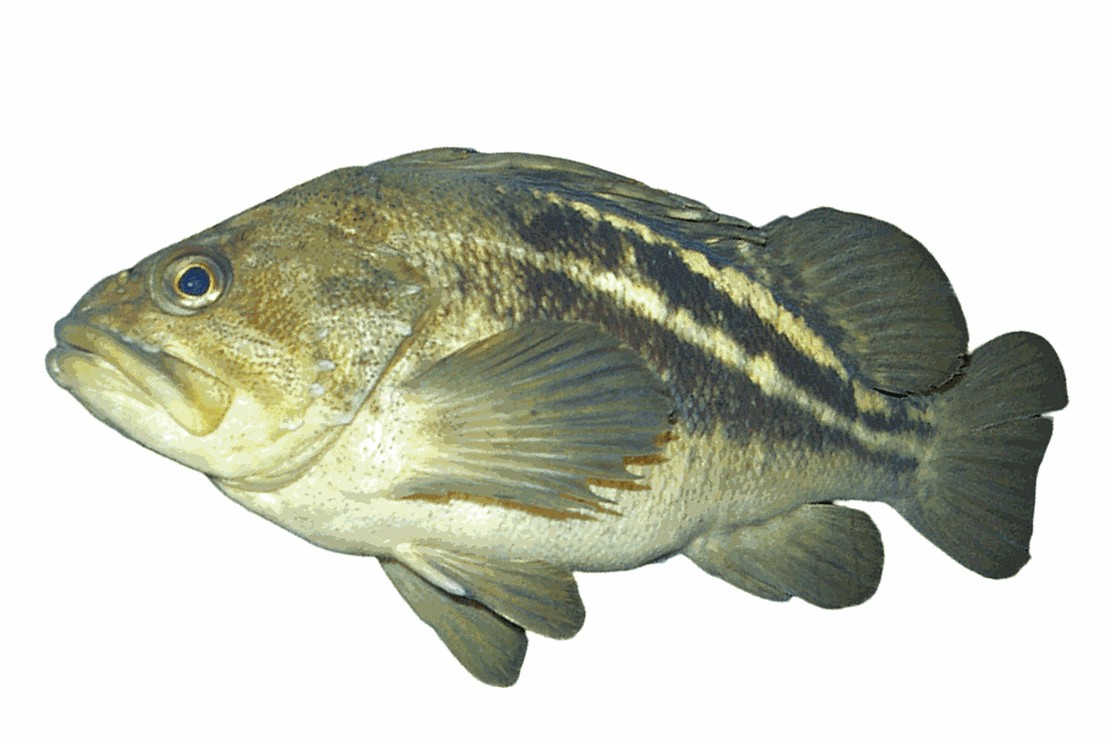

Scientific classification
- Kingdom: Animalia
- Phylum: Chordata
- Class: Actinopterygii
- Order: Perciformes
- Family: Scorpaenidae
- Genus: Sebastes
- Species: S. trivittatus

Binomial name
- Sebastes trivittatus Hilgendorf, 1880

= Sebastes trivittatus =

Species of fish

Sebastes trivittatus, the threestripe rockfish, or threestripe seaperch is a species of marine ray-finned fish belonging to the subfamily Sebastinae, the rockfishes, part of the family Scorpaenidae. It is native to the northwestern Pacific Ocean where it has been recorded from Japan and Korea. This species was first formally described in 1880 by the German zoologist and paleontologist Franz Martin Hilgendorf with the type locality given as Hokkaido. The specific name trivittatus means "threebanded", presumably alluding to the three stripes shown by living adults. Some authorities place this species in the subgenus Pteropodus. This demersal fish is found o rock coasts. It is an ovoviviparous species. This species attains a maximum total length of 62 cm (24 in), although 45.5 cm (17.9 in) and a maximum published weight of 4.7 kg (10 lb).
