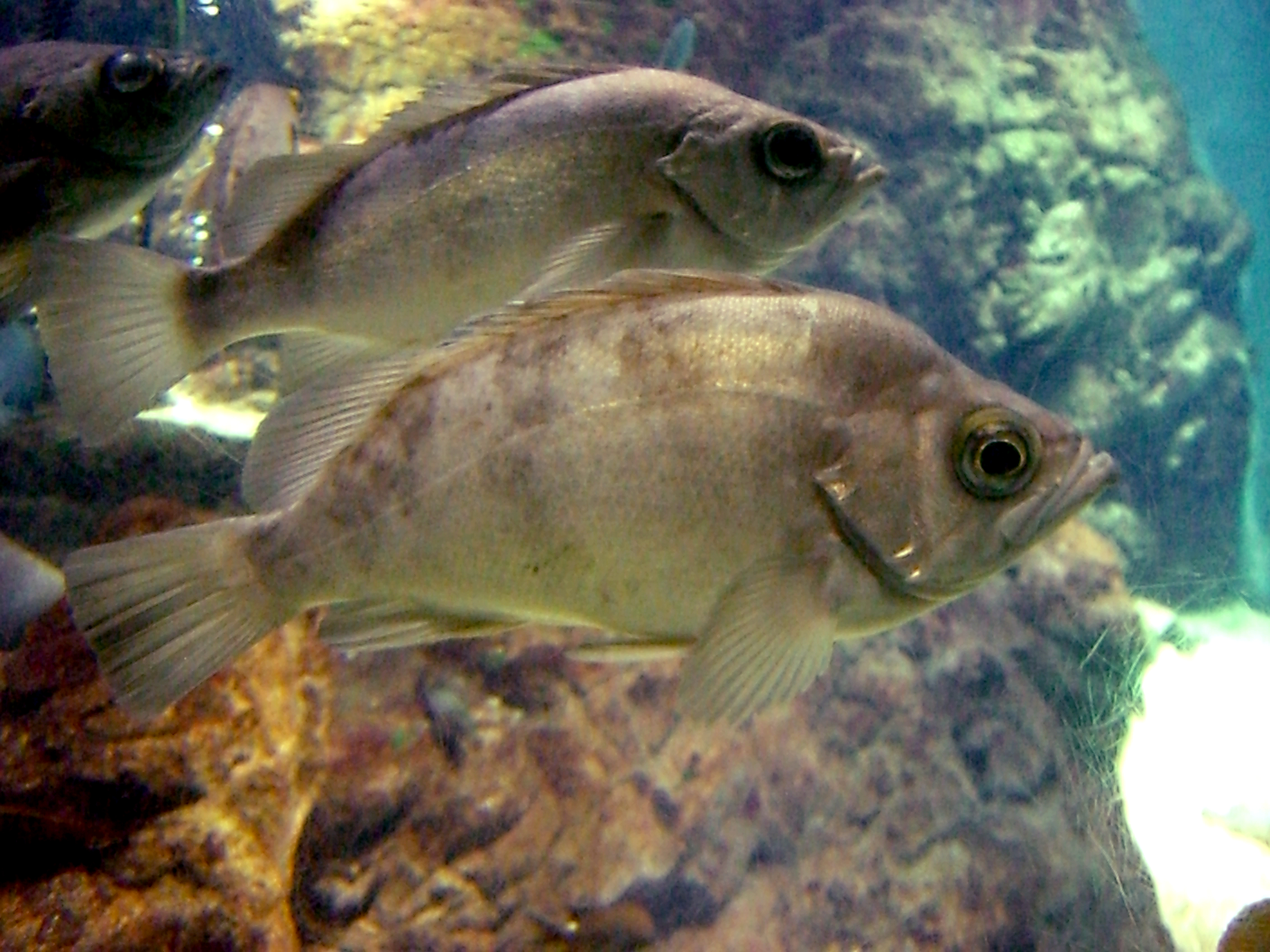

Conservation status
- Least Concern (IUCN 3.1)

Scientific classification
- Kingdom: Animalia
- Phylum: Chordata
- Class: Actinopterygii
- Division: Teleostei
- Order: Perciformes
- Family: Scorpaenidae
- Genus: Sebastes
- Species: S. cheni

Binomial name
- Sebastes cheni Barsukov, 1988

= Sebastes cheni =

Species of fish

Sebastes cheni, the Japanese white seaperch or Japanese blueback seaperch, is a species of marine ray-finned fish belonging to the subfamily Sebastinae, the rockfishes, part of the family Scorpaenidae. It is found in the Northwest Pacific. The species is a popular quarry for anglers. White seaperch is fished for food and game fishing. In Japan this species is known as Mebaru(メバル/鮴).

== Taxonomy ==
Sebastes cheni was first formally described in 1988 by the Soviet zoologist Vladimir Viktorovich Barsukov with the type locality given as Tsuruga in Fukui Prefecture in Japan. This taxon has been regarded as a colour morph of S. inermis in the past and alongside S. ventricosus, these three taxa form a species complex. Some authorities place this species complex in the subgenus Mebarus. The specific name honours Lo-Chai ("Lloyd") Chen of San Diego State University who showed that this was a new species in 1985 in his study of the S. inermis species complex but did not give it a name.

== Description ==
Sebastes cheni has a body which is dark golden-brown on the back and sides when fresh. Its pelvic fin extending past the anus when lowered. The pectoral fins have 17 rays and the anal fin has 8 rays. The lateral line contains 37–46 pored scales.

== Distribution and habitat ==
Sebastes cheni is found in the northwestern Pacific Ocean. It occurs as far north as the Iwate and Akita Preferctures south to Kyushu in Japan and off the southern part of the Korean Peninsula. This species is one of the dominant fish species in seagrass and seaweed beds.

== Biology ==
Sebastes cheni juveniles feed mainly on copepods. The juveniles swim and feed in schools in the daytime but at night they form rather loose aggregations and they youngest suffer the highest predation. As they grow and develop their schooling behaviour becomes more effective and predation pressure reduces.

== Sea perch fishing ==
Sea perch are very popular seawater game fish highly prized especially by fishermen, because they generally put up a good fight when caught with a hook and line. As sea perch are predatory fish, lure fishing (which use replica baits called lures to imitate live prey) is the predominant form of sport fishing involving sea perch, although traditional bait fishing techniques using floats and/or sinkers (particularly with moving live baits such as baitfish, krill or shrimp) are also successful.

It is recommended that when fishing for sea perch, that the fisher(s) should use line in the 1–5 lb test for sea perch. It is also recommended to use a hook size 8-5 for sea perch of all kind. Sea perch, tend to like ragworms, minnows, or cut bait.
