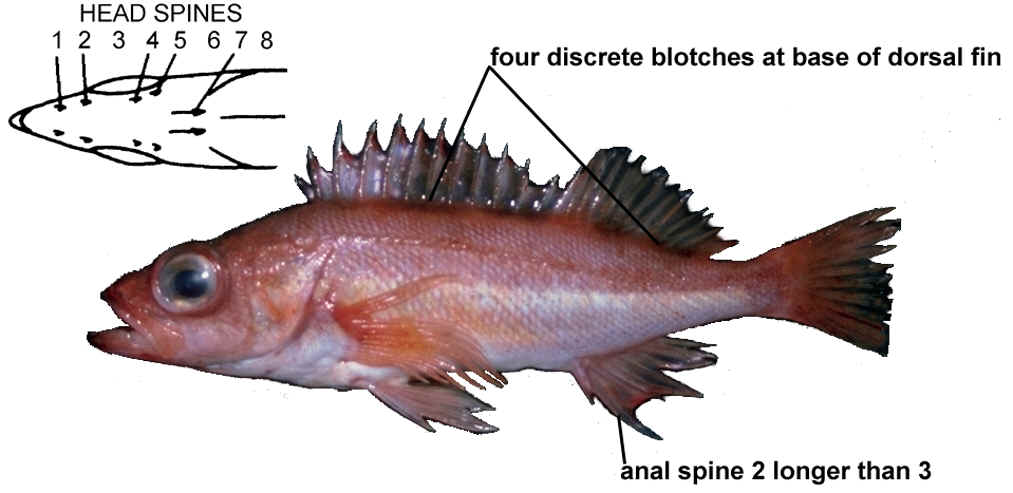

Scientific classification
- Kingdom: Animalia
- Phylum: Chordata
- Class: Actinopterygii
- Order: Perciformes
- Family: Scorpaenidae
- Genus: Sebastes
- Species: S. wilsoni

Binomial name
- Sebastes wilsoni (C. H. Gilbert, 1915)

Synonyms
- Sebastodes wilsoni Gilbert, 1915

= Pygmy rockfish =

Species of fish

The pygmy rockfish (Sebastes wilsoni), also known as the slender rockfish or Wilson's rockfish, is a species of marine ray-finned fish belonging to the subfamily Sebastinae, the rockfishes, part of the family Scorpaenidae. It is found in the Eastern Pacific Ocean.

== Taxonomy ==
The pygmy rockfish was first formally described as Sebastodes wilsoni in 1915 by the American ichthyologist Charles Henry Gilbert with the type locality given as Albatross station 4518 at a depth of 66-140 fathoms off Monterey, California. Some authorities classify this species in the subgenus Allosebastes. The specific name honors Charles Branch Wilson, a marine biologist and authority on crustacean parasites of fishes.

== Description ==
The pygmy rockfish, as its name suggests, is a small species of rockfish which grows to a maximum total length of 23 cm (9.1 in). The dorsal fin has 13 spines and 13 or 14 soft rays while the anal fin contains 3 spines and 6 or 7 soft rays. There are robust spines on the head and the nasal, preocular, postocular, tympanic and parietal spines are present while the supraocular, coronal, and nuchal spines are absent. The caudal fin is truncate or weakly rounded. The color is pale brown tinted with red, paler below. There are 4 dark blotches along the dorsal fin and these extend from the back onto the fin, these can be indistinct. There is a brownish red stripe along the lateral line. The color is notably darker on the back than on the underside.

== Distribution and habitat ==
The pygmy rockfish is found in the Eastern Pacific Ocean along the western coast of North America from Kodiak Island and the Northern Gulf of Alaska to Baja California. It is a demersal fish which is found at depths between 30 and 274 m (98 and 899 ft). It is found offshore in rocky areas.

== Biology ==
The pygmy rockfish, like other rockfish in its genus, is ovoviviparous.
