= Charles H. Beeson =

American classical scholar

Charles Beeson
- Born: October 2, 1870; Columbia City, Indiana
- Died: 1949 (aged 78–79)
- Education: Ludwig-Maximilians-Universität München (PhD)

Charles Henry Beeson (October 2, 1870 – October 1949) was an American classical scholar. His book A Primer of Medieval Latin: An Anthology of Prose and Poetry (1925) has remained one of the leading texts for learning post-classical Latin. In addition, he was an active researcher and reviewer, especially for the journal Classical Philology. In 1935, he was elected a Fellow of the American Academy of Arts and Sciences. He was elected to the American Philosophical Society in 1940.

== Biography ==
Beeson was born in Columbia City, Indiana. In 1893, he received his AB in classics from Indiana University. In 1895, he received his AM from Indiana. In 1907, he received his PhD from the Ludwig-Maximilians-Universität München. While at Indiana University, he assisted Carl Eigenmann in studies of the fishes of Indiana, and elsewhere, and was the coauthor of a few ichthyological papers, including the Fishes of Indiana, Preliminary note on the relationship of the species usually united under the generic name Sebastodes and Pteropodus dallii sp. nov.

During World War I, he worked in the Military Intelligence Division (MID) Cryptography Department (MI-8).

== Publications ==
=== Books ===
- A Primer of Medieval Latin: An Anthology of Prose and Poetry, Chicago, 1925.

=== Articles ===
- "The Vocabulary of the Annales Fuldenses", Speculum Vol. 1 (1), Jan. 1926: 31–37
- "Isidore's Institutionum Disciplinae and Pliny the Younger", Classical Philology Vol. 8 (1), Jan. 1913: 93–98
- "The Text Tradition of Donatus' Commentary on Terence", Classical Philology Vol. 17 (4), Oct. 1922: 283–305
- "The Archetype of the Roman Agrimensores", Classical Philology Vol. 23 (1), Jan. 1928: 1–14
- "The Manuscript Problem of Vitruvius", Classical Philology Vol. 30 (4) Oct. 1935: 342–347
- "The Text History of the Corpus Caesarianum", Classical Philology Vol. 35 (2), Apr. 1940: 113–125
- "The Collectaneum of Hadoard", Classical Philology Vol. 40 (4), Oct. 1945: 201–222
- "The Manuscripts of Bede", Classical Philology Vol. 42 (2), Apr. 1947: 73–87
- "Lupus of Ferrières and Hadoard", Classical Philology Vol. 43 (3) Jul. 1948: 190–191
