= Microcotyle omani =

Scientific classification
- Kingdom: Animalia
- Phylum: Platyhelminthes
- Class: Monogenea
- Order: Mazocraeidea
- Family: Microcotylidae
- Genus: Microcotyle
- Species: M. omani

Binomial name
- Microcotyle omani Machkewskyi, Dmitrieva, Al-Jufaili & Al-Mazrooei, 2013

Synonyms
- Microcotyle omanae Machkewskyi, Dmitrieva, Al-Jufaili & Al-Mazrooei, 2013

Species of worms

Microcotyle omani is a species of monogenean, parasitic on the gills of a marine fish. It belongs to the family Microcotylidae.

== Systematics ==
Microcotyle omani was first described as based on 20 specimens from the gills of the santer seabream Cheimerius nufar (Sparidae) as Microcotyle omanae. The correlations between 15 morphometric characters and body length was investigated in Microcotyle omani, as well as and their significance for species differentiation.

== Morphology ==
Microcotyle omani has the general morphology of all species of Microcotyle, with a symmetrical fusiform elongate body, comprising an anterior part which contains most organs and a posterior part called the haptor. The haptor is subsymmetrical, and bears 94–120 clamps, arranged as two equal rows, one on each side. The clamps of the haptor attach the animal to the gill of the fish. There are also two oval septal buccal suckers at the anterior extremity. The digestive organs include an anterior, terminal mouth, a subcircular pharynx, an oesophagus with lateral diverticula and a posterior intestine bifurcating at the level of the genital atrium into two lateral branches provided with numerous secondary branches; its left branch extends into the haptor. Each adult contains male and female reproductive organs. The reproductive organs include an anterior large inverted heart-shaped genital atrium, armed with numerous spines, a medio-dorsal vagina, a single ovary in form of question-mark and 34–55 testes, irregular in shape and size and generally occurring in 2–4 interleaved rows, intercaecal, in the posterior half of the body proper. The eggs are fusiform, with 2 long filaments bearing strongly curled tips.

== Differential diagnosis ==
Microcotyle omani closely resembles Microcotyle arripis, Microcotyle helotes, Microcotyle caudata and Microcotyle sebastis, found in the Indo-Pacific. It differs from M. arripis, M. helotes and M. caudata by the number of testes, from M. arripis, M. helotes by the genital atrium, and length/width ratio of the genital atrium and length of the eggs, and from M. helotes in greater width of the clamps, from M. caudata and M. sebastis by the number of clamps and the ratio between length and width of the genital atrium.

== Etymology ==
The species name refers to Oman, the type-locality of the species.

== Hosts and localities ==
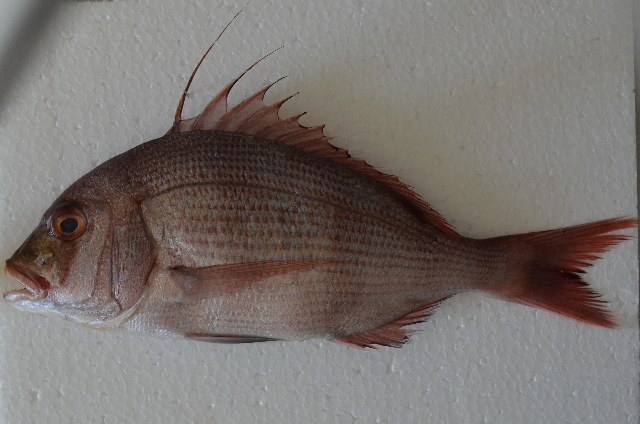
The santer seabream Cheimerius nufar is the type host of Microcotyle omani

The type-host and only recorded host is the santer seabream Cheimerius nufar (Sparidae). The type-locality and only recorded locality is off Oman.
