= Microcotyle arripis =

Scientific classification
- Kingdom: Animalia
- Phylum: Platyhelminthes
- Class: Monogenea
- Order: Mazocraeidea
- Family: Microcotylidae
- Genus: Microcotyle
- Species: M. arripis

Binomial name
- Microcotyle arripis Sandars, 1945

Species of worms

Microcotyle arripis is a species of monogenean, parasitic on the gills of a marine fish. It belongs to the family Microcotylidae.

== Systematics ==
Microcotyle arripis was first described by Sandars in 1945 based on 51 specimens from the gills of the Australian herring Arripis georgianus (Arripidae) off Western Australia. It was redescribed and illustrated from the type host and locality,. All authors noted minor differences in their redescriptions.

A sequence of the species' 28S rRNA gene has been published.

== Description ==
Microcotyle arripis has the general morphology of all species of Microcotyle, with a symmetrical elongated body tapered posteriorly and anteriorly, comprising an anterior part which contains most organs and a posterior part called the haptor. The haptor is symmetrical, not well delimited from body proper and bears 35 pairs of clamps, arranged as two rows, one on each side. The clamps of the haptor attach the animal to the gill of the fish. There are also two buccal suckers at the anterior extremity. The digestive organs include an anterior, terminal mouth, a circular muscular pharynx situated very close to the oral suckers, an oesophagus bifurcating a little distance behind the genital atrium and a posterior intestine with two lateral branches that penetrates the haptor and are provided with numerous secondary branches. Each adult contains male and female reproductive organs. The reproductive organs include an anterior genital atrium opening a little distance behind the pharynx, armed with numerous conical spines, a medio-dorsal vagina, a single S-shaped ovary and 23 testes posterior to the ovary, of irregular shape and fit closely against one another.

== Diagnosis ==
According to Sandars (1945), Microcotyle arripis most closely resembles Microcotyle caudata, Microcotyle truncata, Microcotyle fusiformis, and Microcotyle sebastis. It can be distinguished from these species by different measurements.

== Hosts and localities ==
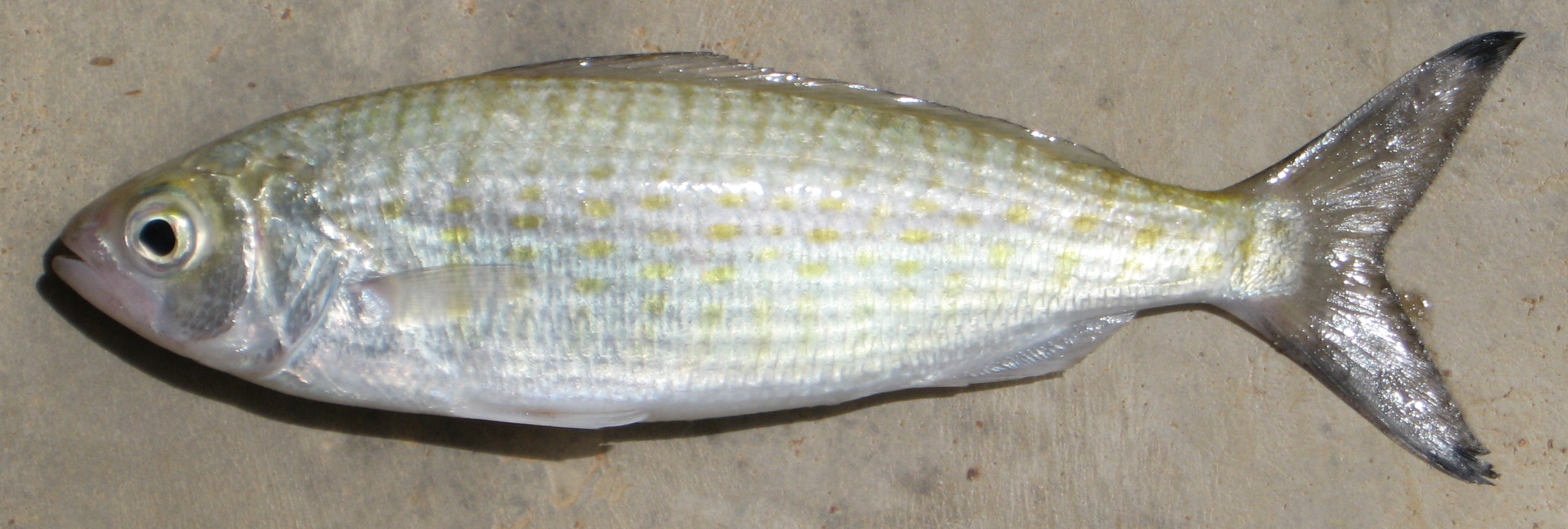
The type-host of Microcotyle arripis is the Australian herring Arripis georgianus

The type-host is the Australian herring Arripis georgianus (Arripidae). The type-locality is off Western Australia. There are other records.
