= Red perch =

Red perch is a name used to refer to several species of fish:

- Red gurnard perch (Helicolenus percoides)
- Rose fish (Sebastes norvegicus, formerly Sebastes marinus)
- Pacific ocean perch (Sebastes alutus)
- Japanese red seaperch (Sebastes inermis)
- Barber perch (Caesioperca rasor)
- Bigeye sea perch (Helicolenus barathri)
