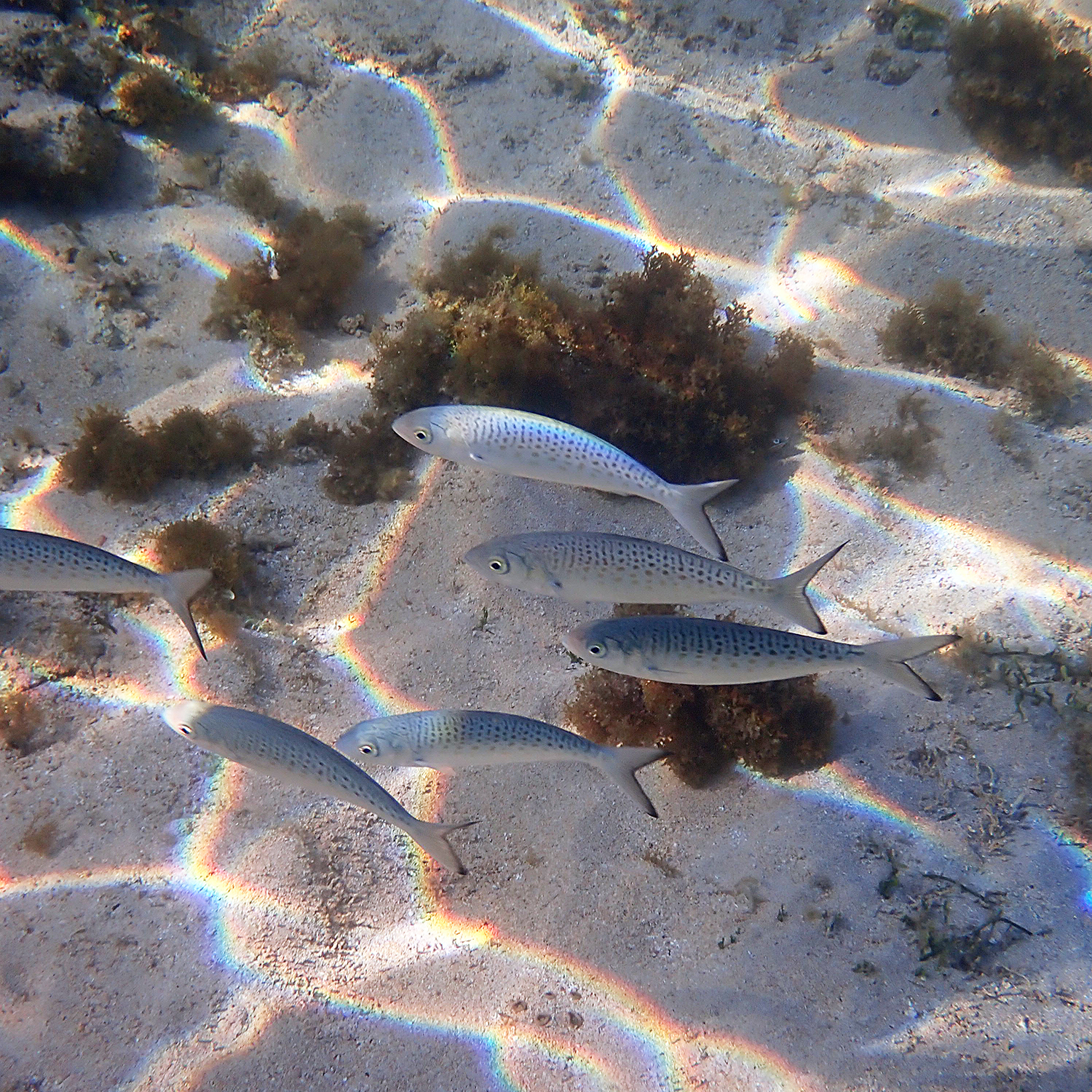
- School of Arripis xylabion near Norfolk Island

Scientific classification
- Kingdom: Animalia
- Phylum: Chordata
- Class: Actinopterygii
- Order: Scombriformes
- Family: Arripidae
- Genus: Arripis
- Species: A. xylabion

Binomial name
- Arripis xylabion Paulin, 1993

= Arripis xylabion =

Species of fish

Arripis xylabion, the giant kahawai, northern kahawai or Kermadec kahawai, is a species of marine ray-finned fish, one of the four species in the genus Arripis, which is the only genus in the family Arripidae. It is endemic to the south-western Pacific Ocean.

== Description ==
Arripis xylabion is similar to the two "Australian salmon" species and like them it has a streamlined, elongate and slightly compressed body. The differences are that A xylabion has a longer caudal fin which is longer than the fish's head. It also has a different gill raker count from the "salmons", A. xylabion has a count of 12-17 +20-25 while A. truttacea has 7-11 + 16-17 and A. trutta has 16-18 +28-32. A. xylabion also has a larger eye than the other two species. The colouration is deep bluish-green on the head and body to deep-blue marked with irregular dark grey spots dorsally and having silvery white underparts. The pectoral fins are grey and the other fins are translucent to grey. The juveniles have a dark margin on their anal fin. The long dorsal fin has 9 spines and 15-16 soft rays while the anal fin has 3 rays and 9-10 soft rays. This species has attained a maximum recorded standard length of 85 centimetres (33 in).

Arripis xylabion can be differentiated from Arripis trutta (kahawai), as the former has a smaller tail.

== Distribution ==
Arripis xylabion is found in the southwestern Pacific Ocean where it occurs around Lord Howe Island and Norfolk Island in the Tasman Sea and in northern New Zealand to the Kermadec Islands.

== Habitat and biology ==
Arripis xylabion is a pelagic species which occurs over the continental shelf. Very little information is known about the biology of this species.

== Taxonomy and etymology ==
Arripis xylabion was first described in 1993 by Chris D. Paulin with the type locality given as Raoul Island in the Kermadec Islands. The specific name xylabion is Greek and means "fire-tongs" and refers to the long tail lobes of this species.
