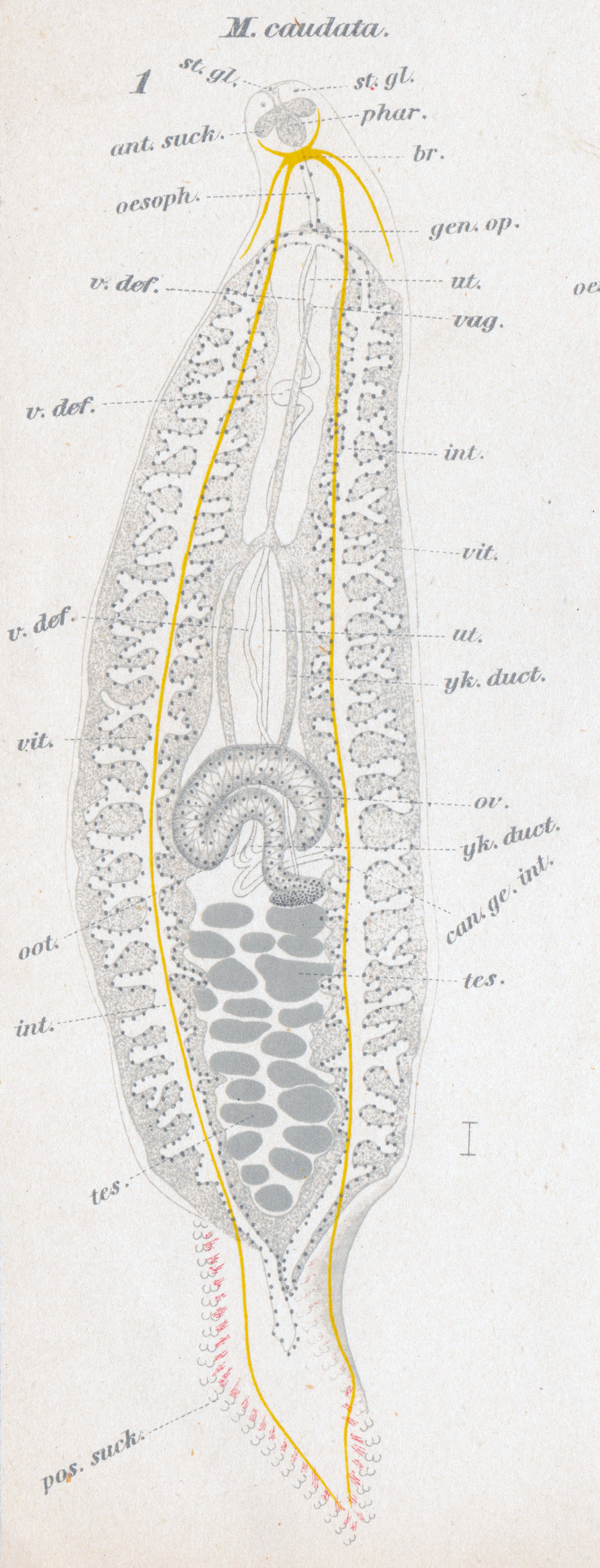
- Microcotyle caudata, drawing from original description

Scientific classification
- Kingdom: Animalia
- Phylum: Platyhelminthes
- Class: Monogenea
- Order: Mazocraeidea
- Family: Microcotylidae
- Genus: Microcotyle
- Species: M. caudata

Binomial name
- Microcotyle caudata Goto, 1894

Synonyms
- Microcotyle (Microcotyle) caudata (Goto, 1894) Unnithan, 1971

= Microcotyle caudata =

Species of worms

Microcotyle caudata is a species of monogenean, parasitic on the gills of a marine fish. It belongs to the family Microcotylidae.

== Systematics ==
Microcotyle caudata was first described by Goto in 1894, based on specimens obtained from the gills of rockfish, Sebastes sp. Unnithan created the subgenus Microcotyle in which he placed Microcotyle caudata as Microcotyle (Microcotyle) caudata. Microcotyle caudata was redescribed by Yamaguti based on two specimens found on the gills of Sebastodes inermis (currently Sebastes inermis )from Ise Bay, that differs from Microcotyle caudata of Goto only by the characters of the esophagus and the frame of clamps. Four years later, Yamaguti provided some measurements of Microcotyle caudata based on several specimens recovered from the gills Sebastodes inermis. Yamaguti hesitated in assigning his specimens to Microcotyle caudata as he was uncertain of the extent of variability of the number of clamps according to individuals. He even pointed that the specimens of Microcotyle caudata recovered from Sebastodes inermis may represent a distinct species. An issue that remains currently is that Sebastes inermis (= Sebastodes inermis) was separated into three species (S. inermis, S.ventricosus, and S. cheni) by Kai and Nakabo in 2008, and thus it is unclear which species corresponds to Yamaguti (1938)’s host

== Morphology ==
Microcotyle caudata has the general morphology of all species of Microcotyle, with an elongated symmetrical body. The body comprises an anterior part which contains most organs and a posterior part called the haptor. The haptor bears about 50 clamps, arranged as two rows (about 25 on each side). The clamps of the haptor attach the animal to the gill of the fish. There are also two buccal suckers provided with a membranous septum and situated at the anterior extremity. The digestive organs include an anterior, terminal mouth, a pharynx, and a posterior intestine with two branches provided with lateral branches both inwards and outwards; the left branch and extends beyond the vitellarium into the caudal haptor while the right branch ends with the vitellarium. Each adult contains male and female reproductive organs. The reproductive organs include a genital atrium opening on the same level as the beginning of the intestinal branches, armed with conical and slightly curved spines, unarmed vagina opening behind the common genital opening, at about six times as far forwards from the anterior end of the ovary, a single ovary, with the oviduct end on the right side, thence extending towards the left, presenting a convex border in front, 23 large testes posterior to the ovary and occupy a little less than one quarter of the whole length of the body. The egg is fusiform, with a very long filament at only one pole and a shorter one at the other. In the original description Goto noted that the curvatures of the body observed in some specimens were not taken into account. He also pointed out that the length of the body varies considerably according to the different state of contraction.

== Hosts and localities ==
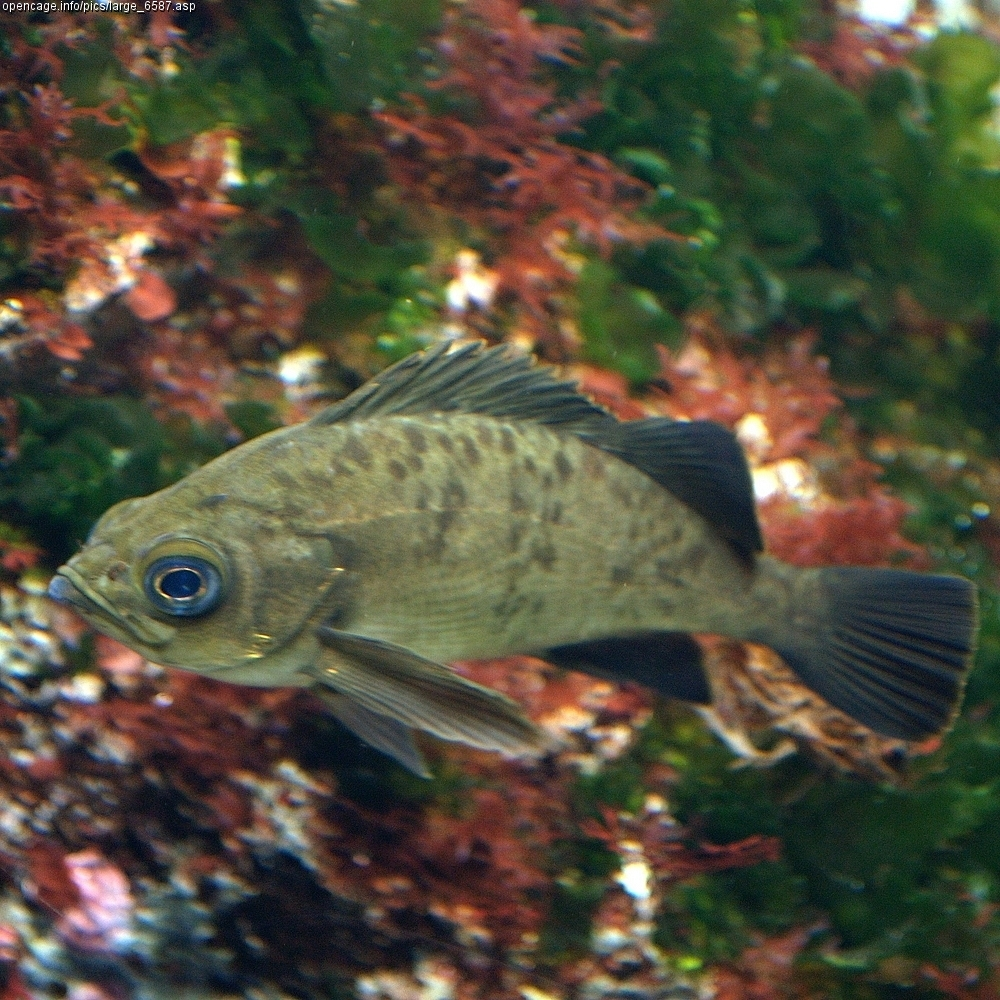
The Darkband Rockfish Sebastes inermis is reported as host of Microcotyle caudata

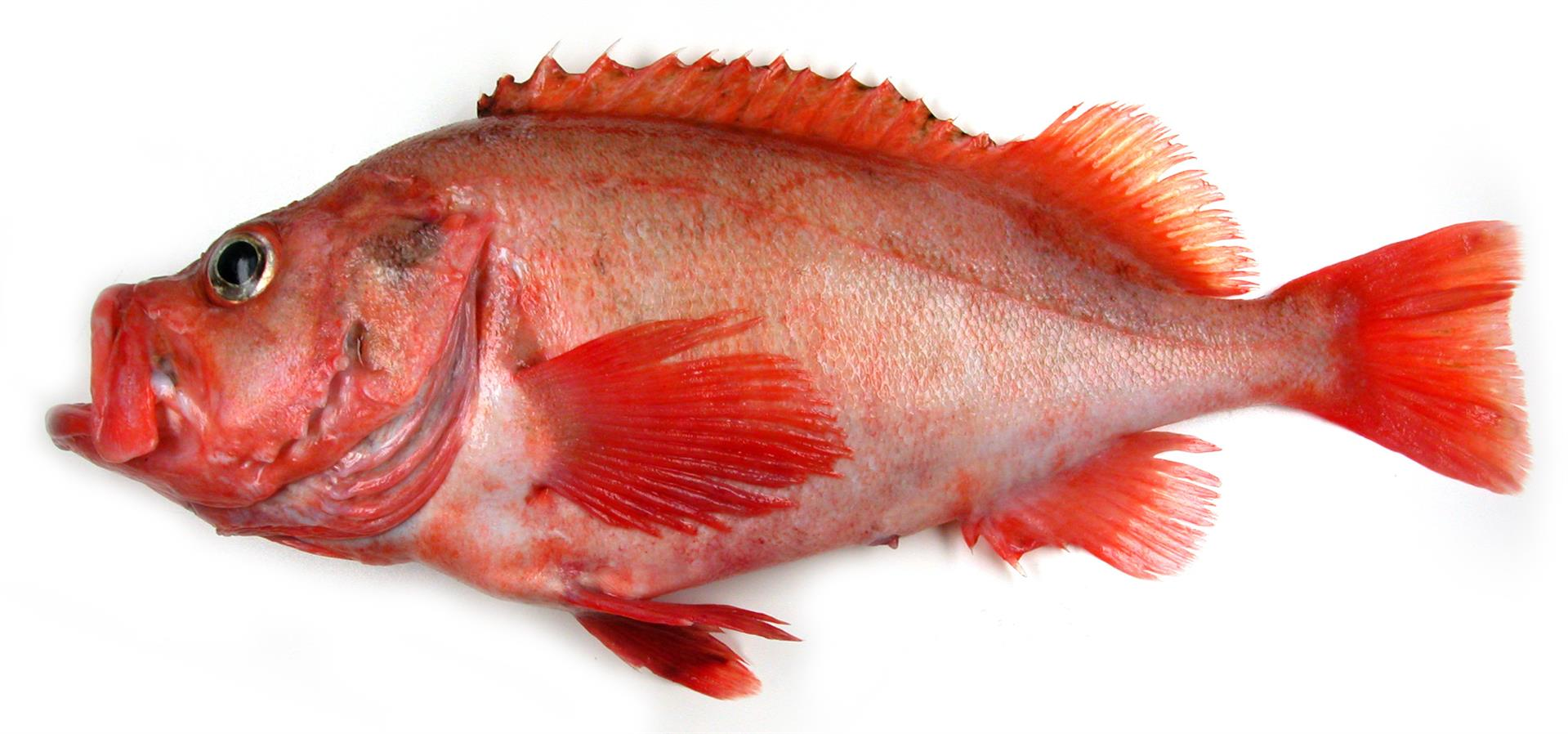
The golden redfish Sebastes norvegicus is also reported as host of Microcotyle caudata

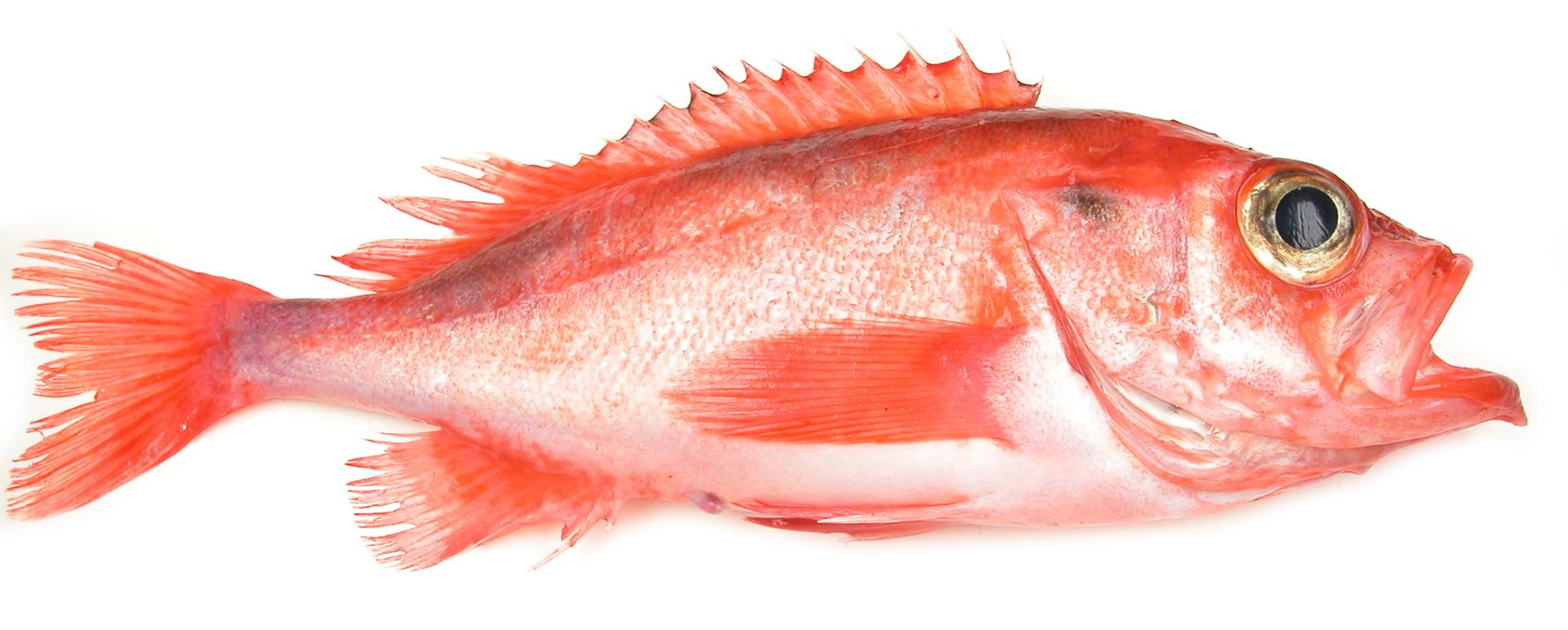
The Beaked redfish Sebastes mentella, another Sebastidae reported as host of Microcotyle caudata

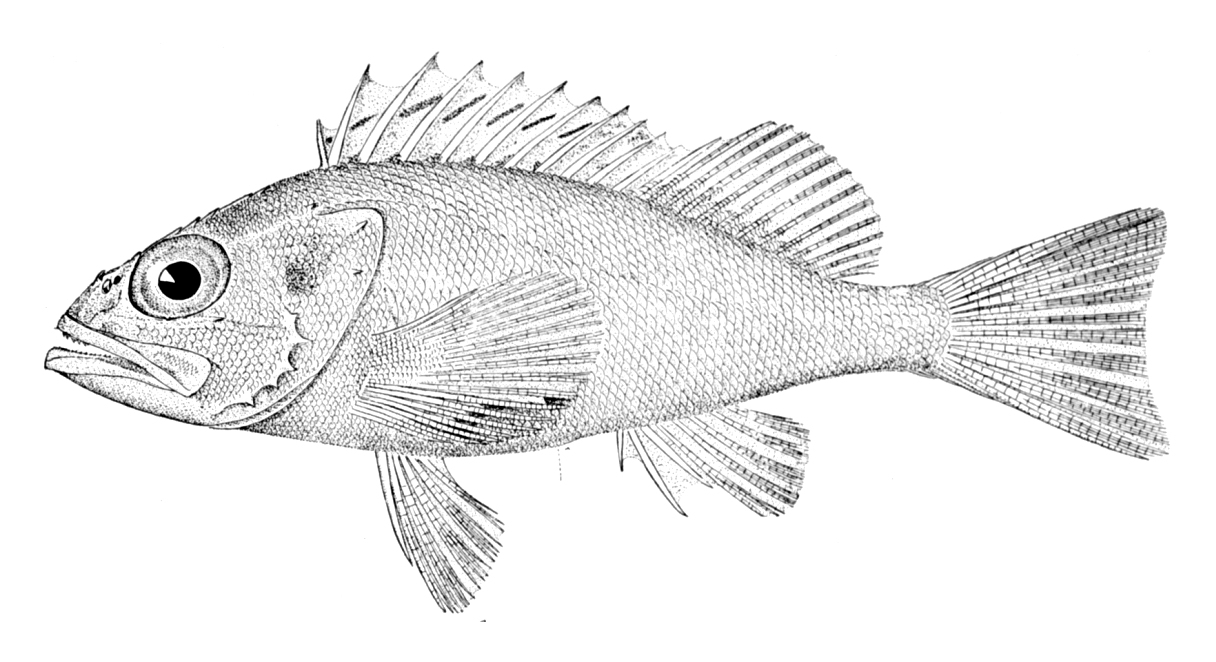
The Blackbelly rosefish Helicolenus dactylopterus, host of Microcotyle sebastis

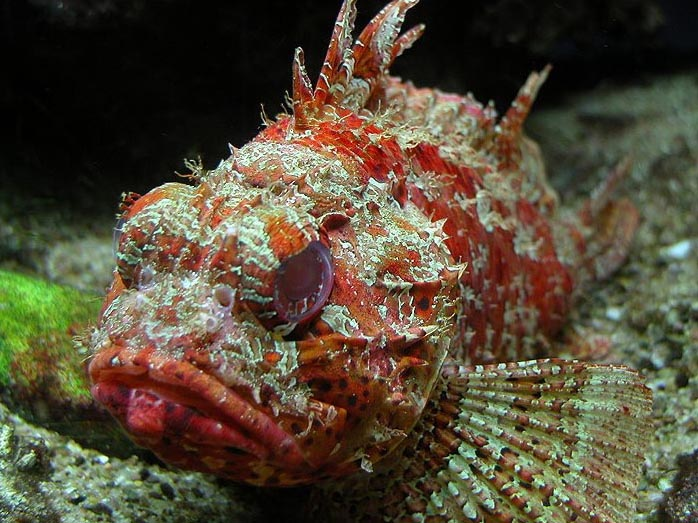
One Scorpaenidae, the red scorpionfish Scorpaena scrofa, is reported as host of Microcotyle sebastis

The type-host of Microcotyle caudata is Sebastes sp. It was also reported on other Sebastidae: the Darkband RockfishSebastodes inermis (currently Sebastes inermis), the golden redfish Sebastes marinus (currently Sebastes norvegicus), the Blackbelly rosefish Helicolenus dactylopterus, the blackbelly Rosefish Helicolenus maculatus ( currently Helicolenus dactylopterus), the red scorpionfish Scorpaena scrofa, and on the Beaked redfish Sebastes mentella. When investigating the ecological and biological characteristics of redfish Sebastes mentella, Melnikov el al. noted the absence of Microcotyle caudata in redfish from the pelagial zone.

Microcotyle caudata was first described from fishes caught off Mitsugahama off Japan. It was also reported off Japan, Russia, Southeast Atlantic, Southwest Indian Ocean, the Mediterranean, and off the southwestern slope of Iceland.
