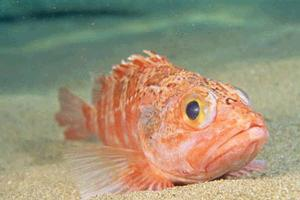
- Blackbelly rosefish (Helicolenus dactylopterus)

Scientific classification
- Kingdom: Animalia
- Phylum: Chordata
- Class: Actinopterygii
- Order: Perciformes
- Suborder: Scorpaenoidei
- Family: Scorpaenidae
- Subfamily: Sebastinae
- Genus: Helicolenus; Goode & T. H. Bean, 1896

Type species
- Scorpaena dactyloptera Delaroche, 1809

Species
- See text.

= Helicolenus =

Genus of fishes

Helicolenus is a genus of marine ray-finned fishes belonging to the family Scorpaenidae where they are classified within the subfamily Sebastinae, the rockfishes. The species in this genus are found in the Indian, Atlantic and Pacific oceans.

== Taxonomy ==
Helicolenus was described by a genus in 1896 by the American ichthyologists George Brown Goode & Tarleton Hoffman Bean using Scorpaena dactyloptera as its type species which had originally been described by the Genevan physician, naturalist, chemist, botanist and ichthyologist François Étienne Delaroche in 1809. The genus name is a compound of helikos which means "twisted" or "curved" but meaning "strong" according to Goode and Bean, possibly in error for hadros; and oleni meaning "elbow" or "arm", an allusion to the "strong pectoral fins" of H. dactylopterus.

== Species ==
There are 9 recognised species:

- Helicolenus avius T. Abe & Eschmeyer, 1972
- Helicolenus barathri (Hector, 1875) (bigeye sea perch, Offshore ocean perch, bigeye ocean perch)
- Helicolenus dactylopterus (Delaroche, 1809) (blackbelly rosefish)
- Helicolenus fedorovi Barsukov, 1973
- Helicolenus hilgendorfii (Döderlein (de), 1884) (Hilgendorf's saucord)
- Helicolenus lahillei Norman, 1937
- Helicolenus lengerichi Norman, 1937
- Helicolenus mouchezi (Sauvage, 1875)
- Helicolenus percoides (J. Richardson & Solander, 1842) (red gurnard perch, Inshore ocean perch, reef ocean perch, jock stewart)

== Characteristics ==
Helicolenus fishes have a large head which bears spiny ridges and has a large mouth. There are 5 spines on the posterior and lower margin of the preoperculum and two obvious spines close to the posterior of the operculum. Their dorsal fins have 11-13 robust spines and 10 to 14 soft rays. Species in this genius vary in length from a standard length of 27 cm (11 in) in H. fedorovi and H. hilgendorfii up to a total length of 50 cm (20 in) in H. dactylopterus.

== Distribution and habitat ==
Helicolenus rockfishes are found in the Pacific and Atlantic oceans. They are benthic, demersal and bathydemersal fishes.

== Biology ==
Helicolenus rockfishes are ovoviviparous and fertilisation is internal. They are predators of cephalopods, echinoderms, crustaceans and fishes. They have been known to live for up to 42 years.

== Fisheries ==
Helicolenus rockfishes are commercially important species in fisheries in some regions such as southern Australia.
