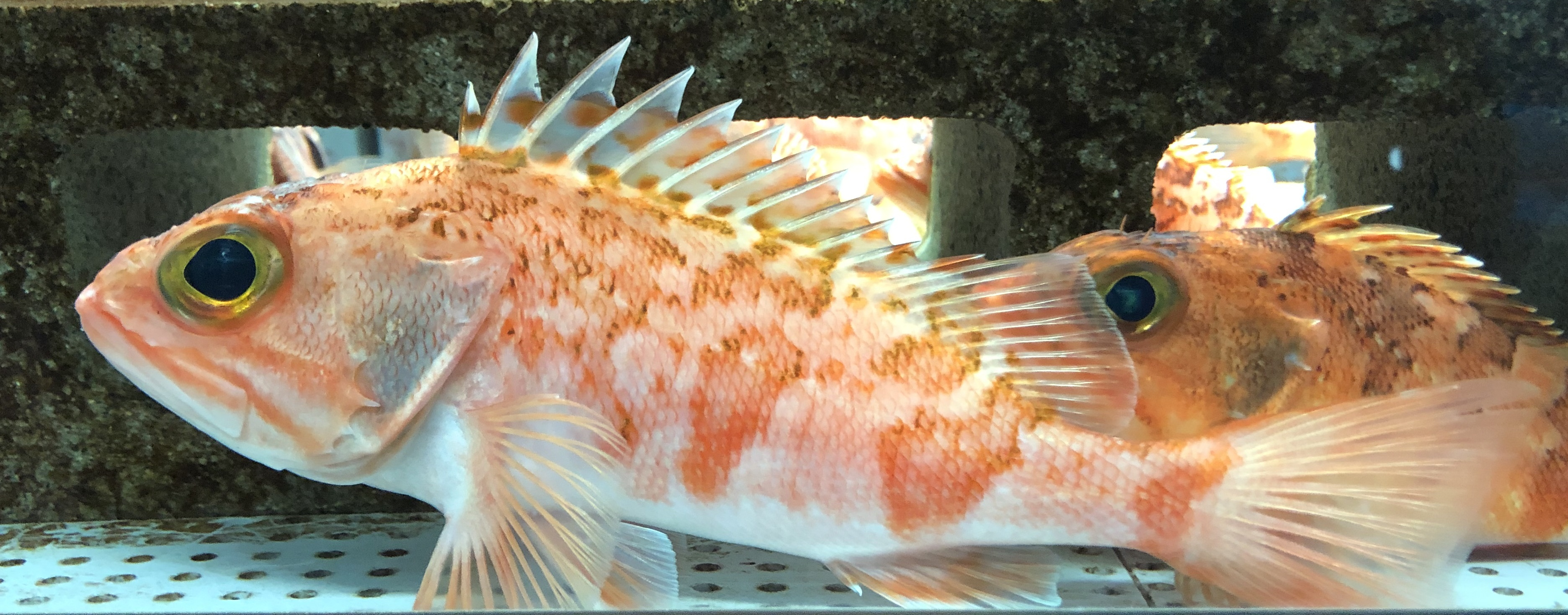

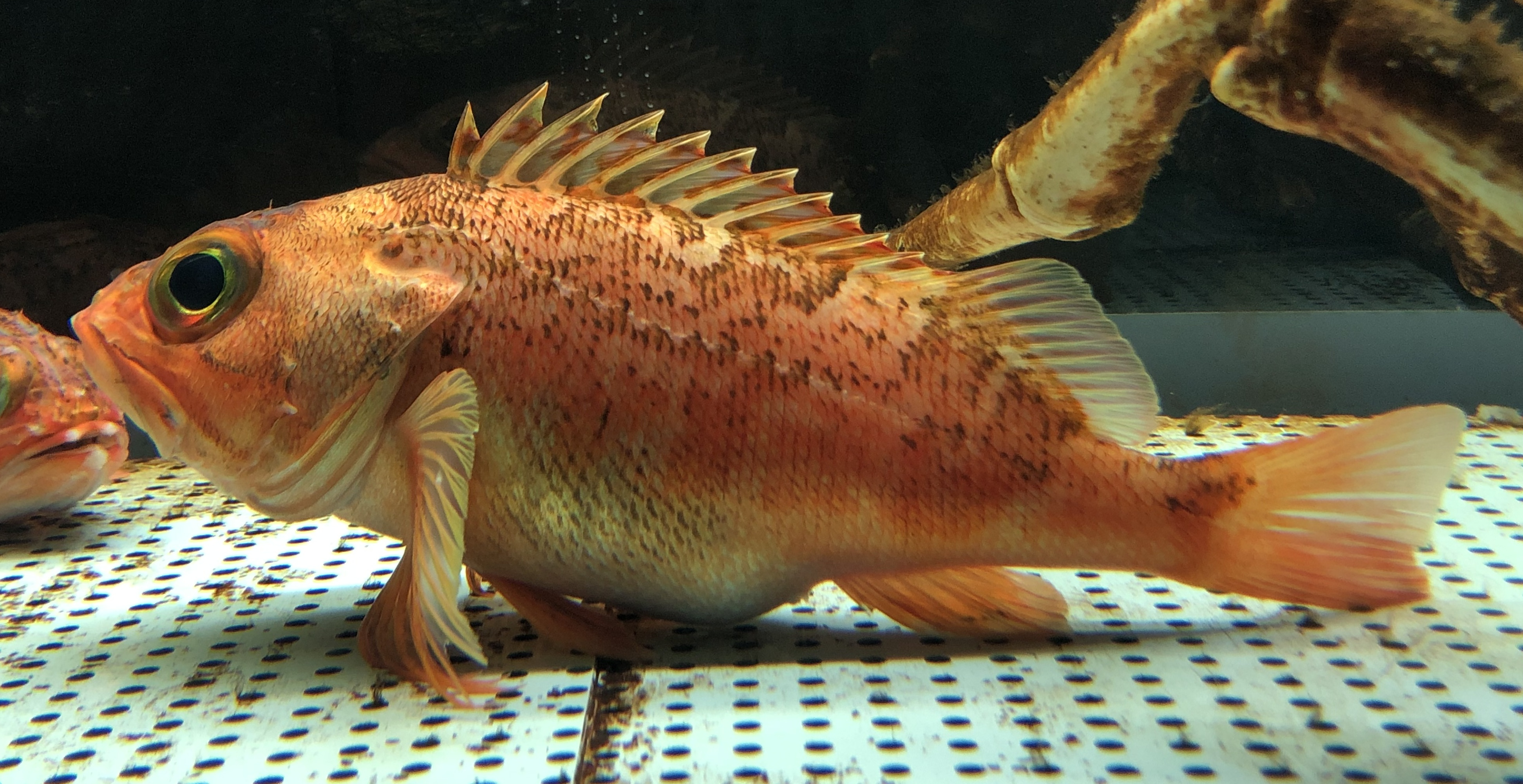

Scientific classification
- Kingdom: Animalia
- Phylum: Chordata
- Class: Actinopterygii
- Order: Perciformes
- Family: Scorpaenidae
- Genus: Helicolenus
- Species: H. hilgendorfii

Binomial name
- Helicolenus hilgendorfii (Döderlein, 1884)

Synonyms
- Sebastes hilgendorfii Döderlein

= Helicolenus hilgendorfii =

Species of fish

Helicolenus hilgendorfii, Hilgendorf's saucord, is a species of marine ray-finned fish belonging to the subfamily Sebastinae, part of the family Scorpaenidae. It is found in the northwestern Pacific Ocean.

== Taxonomy ==
Helicolenus hilgendorfii was first formally described in 1884 as Sebastes hilgendorfii by the German zoologist Ludwig Heinrich Philipp Döderlein with the type locality given as Tokyo, although no types are known. Döderlein did not state who was honoured in the specific name but it is certainly the German zoologist and palaeontologist Franz Martin Hilgendorf whose work on Japanese fishes was often referred to by Döderlein.

== Description ==
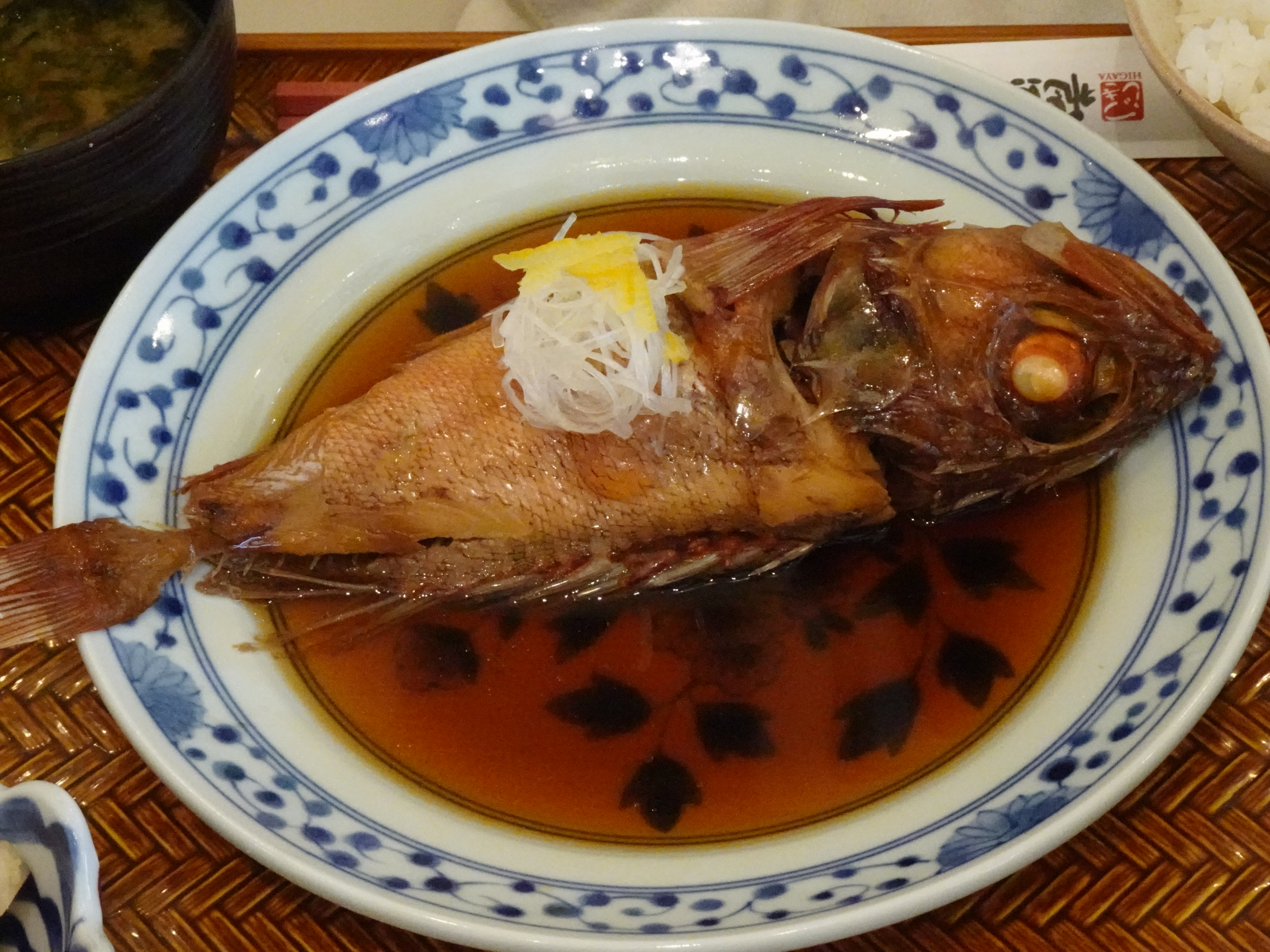
As part of a Japanese meal

Helicolenus hilgendorfii attains a maximum standard length of 27 cm (11 in). It has an elongated, compressed body with a large head which has weak spines. The orbit protrudes a little over the dorsal profile of the head. They do not have a swim bladder. There are no teeth in the front of the jaws. The preoperculum has 5 spines and the operculum has 2. The body is covered with ctenoid scales and there are 26-27 scales in the lateral line. The dorsal fin has 12 short spines with the membranes between them being slightly notched, and 11-13 soft rays. The anal fin is slightly shorter than the spiny dorsal fin and contains 3 spines and 4-6 soft rays. The pectoral fin extends to just in front of the anus while the pelvic fin has a single spine and 5 soft rays and the caudal fin is truncate. The body is light red in colour with orange-red mottling on the flanks above the lateral line. The spines of the dorsal fin are orange-red with the rest of the fin being a light colour.

== Distribution and habitat ==
Helicolenus hilgendorfii is found in the northwestern Pacific Ocean from Japan and southern Korea southwards into the East China Sea. It is a demersal species which is found in areas of sandy and muddy substrates. it is found at depths of 150 to 300 m (490 to 980 ft).

== Biology ==
Helicolenus hilgendorfii is viviparous. This is a carnivorous fish which although specialised to feed on shrimps, especially Crangon hakodatei, it is an opportunistic predator and as the fish grows it consumes less shrimps and more fishes. The krill species Euphausia pacifica has also been recorded as a prey item for this fish.
