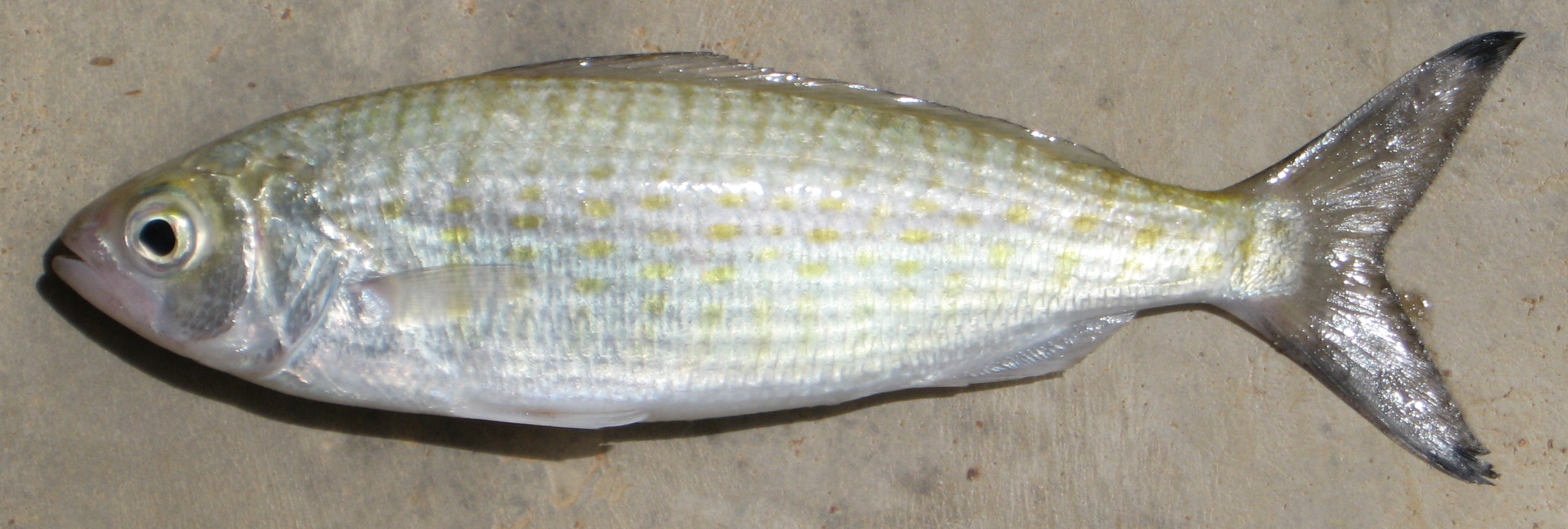

Scientific classification
- Kingdom: Animalia
- Phylum: Chordata
- Class: Actinopterygii
- Order: Scombriformes
- Family: Arripidae
- Genus: Arripis
- Species: A. georgianus

Binomial name
- Arripis georgianus (Valenciennes, 1831)

Synonyms
- Centropristes georgianus Valenciennes, 1831

= Australian herring =

Species of fish

The Australian herring (Arripis georgianus), also known as the ruff, tommy ruff, or Australian ruff, is one of four Australasian fish species within the genus Arripis. It closely resembles its sister species, the Australian salmon, although it grows to a smaller size. Like the other members of its genus, it is found in cooler waters around the southern coast of Australia. It is not biologically related to the herring family Clupeidae.

In Australia, additional vernacular names used for this fish include bull herring, herring, rough, ruffies, sea herring, tommy, tommy rough and South Australian roughy. Ruff is the global fisheries name used by the Food and Agriculture Organization.

== Description ==
The Australian herring has a streamlined, moderately deep and slightly elongate body which is somewhat compressed and has a relatively thin caudal peduncle. It has a quite small head with rather large eyes and a moderately large oblique mouth with the maxillae extending as far as the level of the centre of eyes. It has a narrow band of small, pointed teeth on each jaw. It has an almost straight lateral line. The whole of the head and body, except for the lower jaw, snout and over the eyes is covered in small, finely ctenoid scales. The long dorsal fin has a small notch between the higher spiny and the soft rayed parts, They have a small anal fin which is around half the length of the soft part of the dorsal fin. The caudal fin is deeply forked, the pectoral fins are small and the pelvic fins are moderately sized, having their origin underneath the centre of the pectoral fin base and extending midway to the anus. Australian herring are similar to the juveniles of the congeneric Australian salmon and differ from that species by their comparatively larger yellow and black eye and rounder head. This species is silver in colour with black tips on tail and gold spots along the upper body. The juveniles have dark golden bars on their flanks. The dorsal fin contains 9 spines and 16 soft rays and the anal fin has 3 spines and 10 soft rays. The maximum fork length recorded is 41 centimetres (16 in) but they are commonly 25–30 centimetres (9.8–11.8 in).

== Distribution ==
The Australian herring is endemic to the temperate seas of southern Australia from the Swan River in Western Australia along the south coast and along the east coast as far north as Forster, New South Wales. It is also found around Tasmania.

== Habitat and biology ==
Australian herring form large schools in sea-grass meadows, off beaches, over reefs, in coastal bays and in estuaries. They are normally found near the surface, going no deeper than a few metres. They are predators feeding on smaller fishes and some invertebrates which live among the weed beds and sea grass meadows. These fish reach sexual maturity at around 2–3 years of age and once mature they move westwards along the Australian coast to an area of the southwestern coast where they spawn alongside adults resident in that area. The spawning takes place in April to June. The fertility of the females depends on their size, a 20 centimetres (7.9 in) long individual may lay 50,000 eggs while a 33 centimetres (13 in) females may lay 200,000 eggs in a spawning season. The eggs, larvae and juveniles are planktonic and drift southwards along the western coast of Australia and eastward along its south coast by the prevailing winds and currents, the Leeuwin Current being particularly important in this. At 30–60 millimetres (1.2–2.4 in) length the juveniles settle in the winter and spring using nursery sites along the south coast. Some remain close to where the spawning grounds are along the southern part of the western coast of Western Australia. Geographe Bay appears to be a very important source of recruitment for the west coast population. Once they have spawned, the adult fish remain off the west coast of Western Australia and do not return to the south coast. They disperse along the coast, they move into estuaries and go as far north as Shark Bay.

== Fisheries ==
In most of Australia this is a species which is considered to be a desirable recreational fish. However, in Western Australia it is regarded as a commercially important species for fisheries and has been caught using lines, gill nets and seine nets. They were fished for using 'G' trap nets but following scientific advice on the health of the stock this was banned in 2015. It has a soft, slightly oily flesh and is thought of as a high quality food fish.

== Taxonomy and species description ==
The Australian herring was first formally described as Centropristes georgianus in 1831 by Achille Valenciennes with the type locality given as King George Sound in Western Australia. When Leonard Jenyns placed it in the new genus Arripis this was a monospecific genus and Arripis georgianus was therefore the type species.
