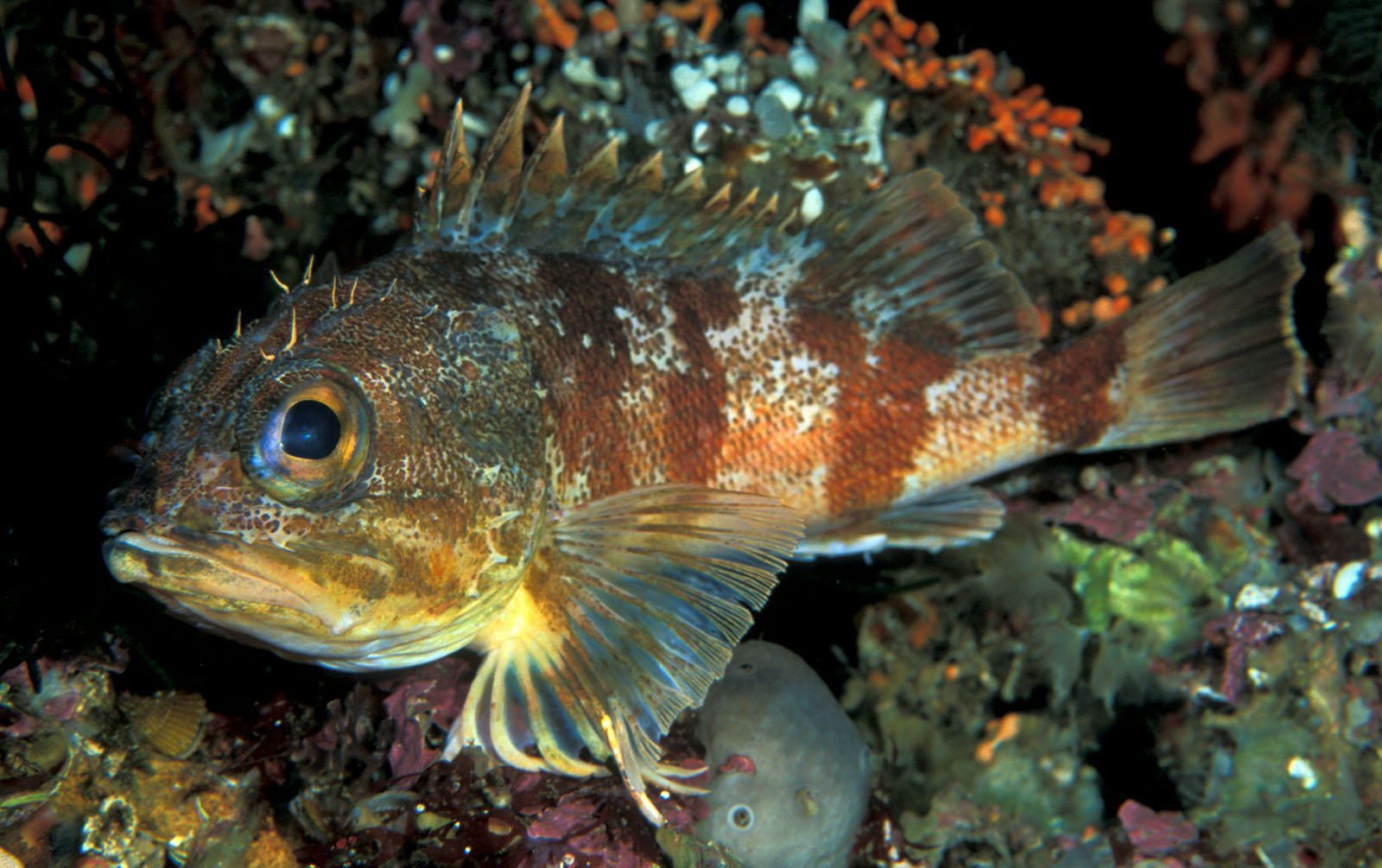

Scientific classification
- Kingdom: Animalia
- Phylum: Chordata
- Class: Actinopterygii
- Order: Perciformes
- Family: Scorpaenidae
- Genus: Helicolenus
- Species: H. percoides

Binomial name
- Helicolenus percoides (J. Richardson & Solander, 1842)

Synonyms
- Sebastes percoides Richardson & Solander, 1842; Sebastes alporti Castelnau, 1873; Helicolenus alporti (Castelnau, 1873)

= Helicolenus percoides =

Species of fish

Helicolenus percoides, the reef ocean perch, coral cod, coral perch, Jock Stewart, kuriarki, ocean perch, red gurnard perch, red gurnard scorpionfish, red ocean perch, red perch, red rock perch, scarpee or sea perch, is a species of marine ray-finned fish belonging to the subfamily Sebastinae, part of the family Scorpaenidae. It is found in the southwestern Pacific Ocean.

== Taxonomy ==
Helicolenus percoides was first formally described as Sebastes percoides in 1842 by the Scottish naval surgeon, naturalist and Arctic explorer John Richardson based on a brief description by Daniel Solander and an unfinished drawing made by Sydney Parkinson. The type localities was given as off Cape Kidnappers and at Motuaro, Queen Charlotte Sound in New Zealand. This and H. barathri are very similar and have been considered to be the same species by some authorities. The specific name percoides means "perch-like".

== Description ==
Helicolenus percoides has a moderately large, smooth head which has a length which is 35-41% of its standard length, with moderately large eyes which do not bulge over the dorsal profile; of the head.there are 5 distinct spines on the front margin of each of the preopercles, uppermost is quite small and is located at the end of a low, spineless ridge underneath the eye. The body and much of the head are covered in rather small ctenoid scales. The pelvic fins reach beyond anus. The dorsal fin has 12 spines and 11-12 soft rays while the anal fin has 3 spines and 5 soft rays. This species attains a maximum total length of 47 cm (19 in) and a maximum published weight of 1.4 kg (3.1 lb). The overall colour is pinkish-orange to whitish marked with three broad orange to dark brown bands on the flanks which continue onto the dorsal and anal fins. The two anterior most bands are normally split on the upper flanks, and there is frequently a single wide band on the caudal and pectoral fins. Fishes from shallow waters are typically darker and often have dense speckling with dark spots on the dorsal part of the head and flanks.

=== Identification ===
Helicolenus percoides is distinguished from H. barathri by that species larger eyes which have a diameter equal to 34-41% of the length of the head and that there are normally 13-14 soft rays in the dorsal fin, whereas the eye diameter of this species is equal to 27-33% of the length of the head and it normally has 11-12 soft fin rays in its dorsal fin.

== Distribution and habitat ==
Helicolenus percoides is found in the southwestern Pacific Ocean. In Australia it occurs from northern New South Wales south to Tasmania and east to Fremantle in Western Australia. It is also found in New Zealand. It is a demersal fish which is found at depths of 50 to 750 m (160 to 2,460 ft) on the continental shelf and slope. it can be found ion coastal rocky reefs as well as open sandy areas normally in deeper waters.

In the month-long NORFANZ Expedition of 2003 which was examining the biodiversity of the seamounts and slopes of the Norfolk Ridge, thirty specimens averaging 1 kg (2.2 lb), were collected from three locations.

== Biology ==
Helicolenus percoides is a predatory fish which feeds on fishes, squids and crustaceans. They are ovoviviparous, the females do not lay eggs but are fertilised internally and release small larvae into the water. Extruding them in gelatinous masses at 1mm in length. The spines on the dorsal fin and the head are venomous. They live for around 42 years.

== Fisheries ==
Helicolenus percoides is an important species for commercial fisheries with white meat that is mild tasting. The catch is managed jointly with that of H. barathri with a combined catch limit in Australian waters of 304 tonnes in 2021/22.
