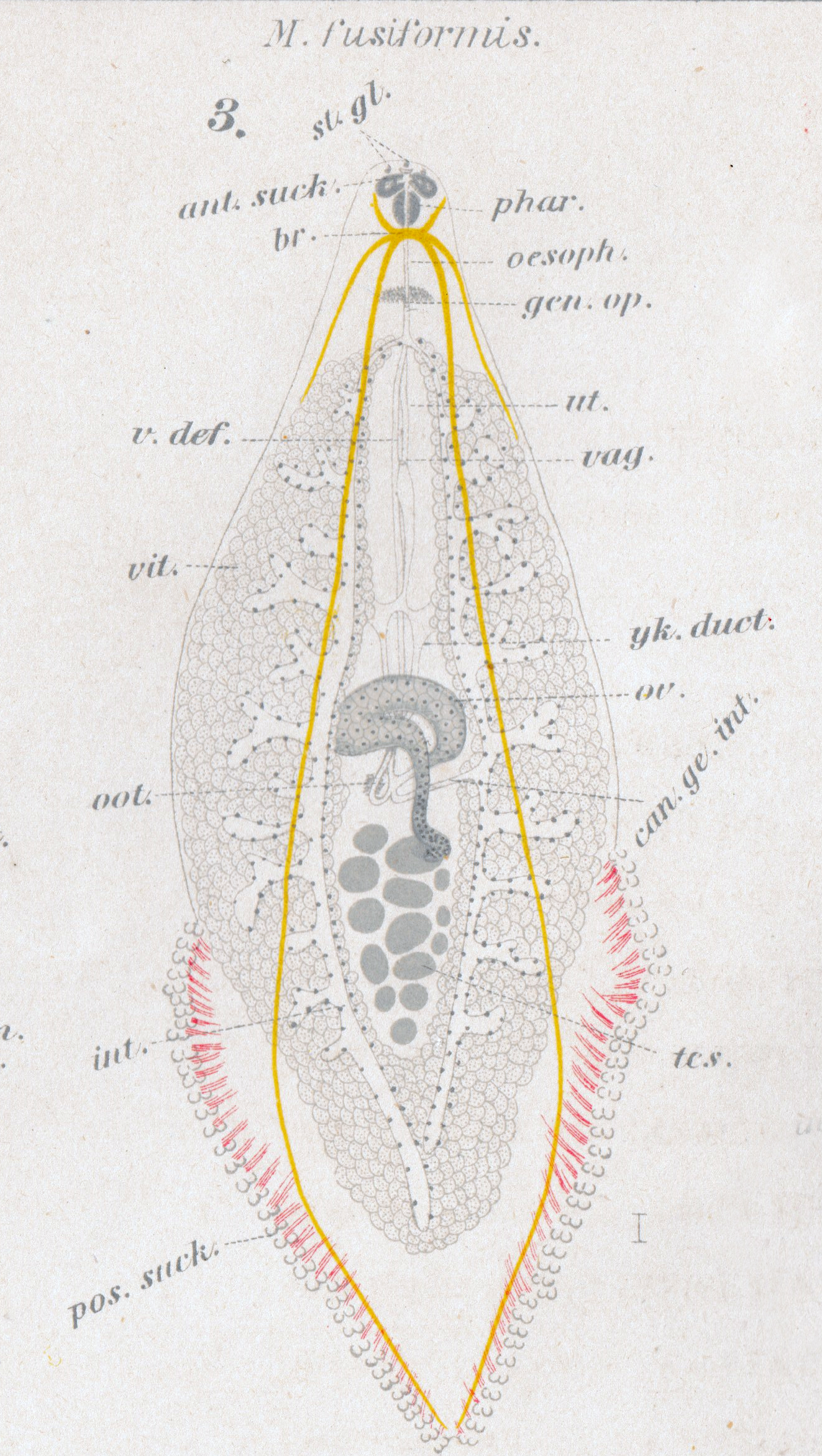
- Microcotyle fusiformis, drawing from original description

Scientific classification
- Kingdom: Animalia
- Phylum: Platyhelminthes
- Class: Monogenea
- Order: Mazocraeidea
- Family: Microcotylidae
- Genus: Microcotyle
- Species: M. fusiformis

Binomial name
- Microcotyle fusiformis Goto, 1894

Synonyms
- Microcotyle (Microcotyle) fusiformis (Goto, 1894) Unnithan1971

= Microcotyle fusiformis =

Species of worms

Microcotyle fusiformis is a species of monogenean, parasitic on the gills of a marine fish, described by Seitarō Gotō in 1894. It belongs to the family Microcotylidae. This species was first .

== Systematics ==
Microcotyle fusiformis was first described by Goto in 1894 from the gills of Centronotus nebulosa (Pholidae) (currently Pholis nebulosa). Unnithan (1971) placed M. fusiformis in the nominal subgenus Microcotyle as Microcotyle (Microcotyle) fusiformis. However, this species was returned to the genus Microcotyle by Mamaev in 1986.

== Description ==
Microcotyle fusiformis has the general morphology of all species of Microcotyle, with a flat symmetrical body, fusiform in outline, comprising an anterior part which contains most organs and a posterior part called the haptor. The haptor is symmetrical, continuous with the rest of the body and bears clamps, arranged as two rows, one on each side. The clamps of the haptor attach the animal to the gill of the fish. There are also two small septated buccal suckers at the anterior extremity. The digestive organs include an anterior, terminal mouth, a muscular pharynx, and a posterior intestine with two lateral blind-ending branches; the left branch is longer. Each adult contains male and female reproductive organs. The reproductive organs include an anterior genital atrium opening a little anterior to midway between the hinder end of the pharynx and that of the oesophagus, armed with small conical spines, a dorsal vagina situated behind the common genital opening two-fifths the whole distance between this and the front end of the ovary, a single ovary nearly shaped as an interrogation-point, and few testes of moderate size, posterior to the ovary and occupying a comparatively small area about one-sixth the whole length of the body.

== Hosts, localities and specimens ==
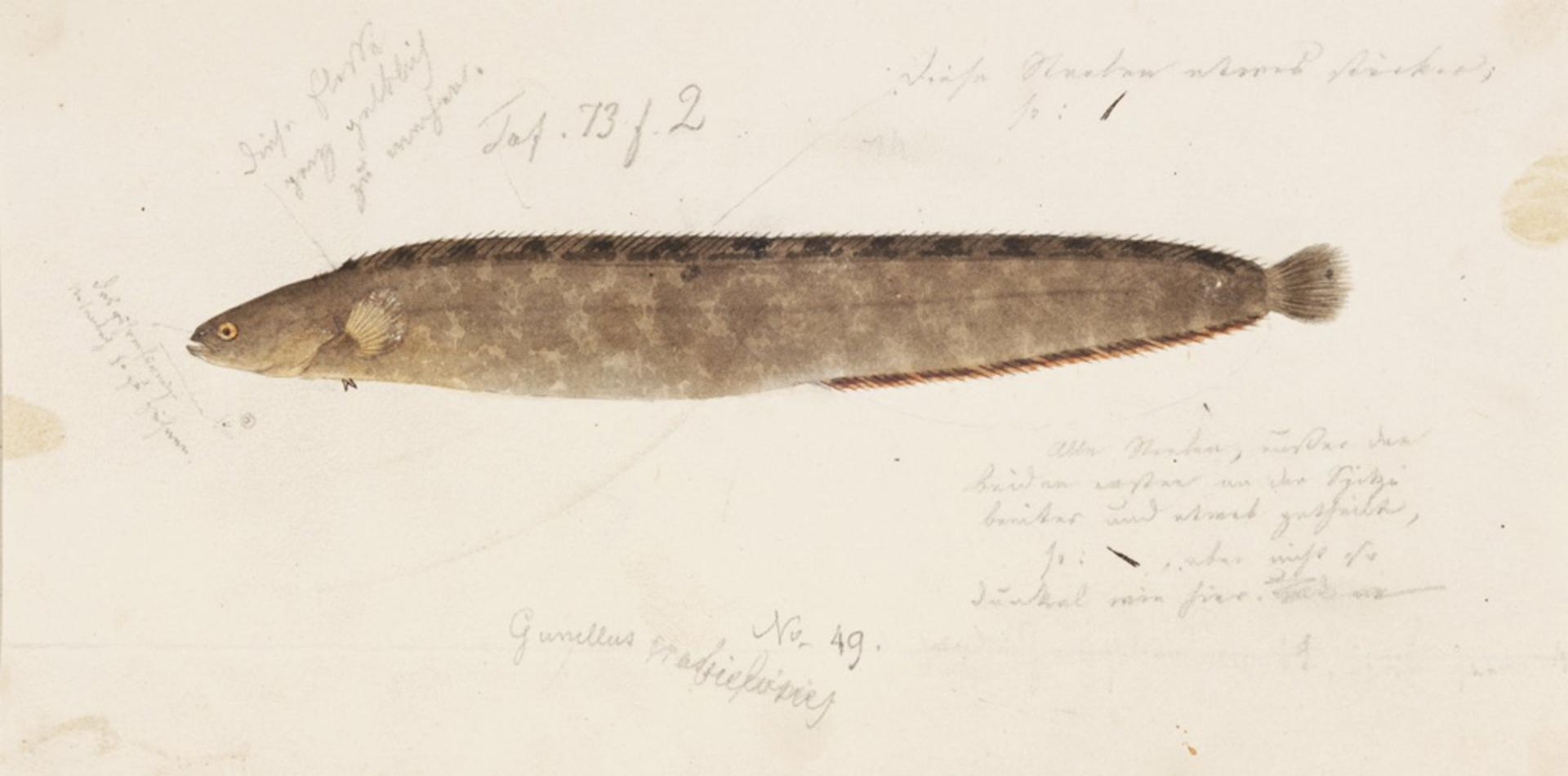
Enedrias nebulosus is the type host of Microcotyle fusiformis

The rock gunnel Pholis gunnellus is also host of Microcotyle fusiformis

The type-host in the original publication is Centronotus nebulosa but this name is not anymore in use. No specimen is available in the collections of the University of Tokyo. It was also recorded on another Pholidae, the rock gunnel Pholis gunnellus off Ireland. The type-locality is off Japan. In 1940, Crofton gave a note on specimens found on the gills of Pholis gunnellus (designated as Centronotus gunnellus), collected from rock-pools at Cullercoats, Northumberland.
