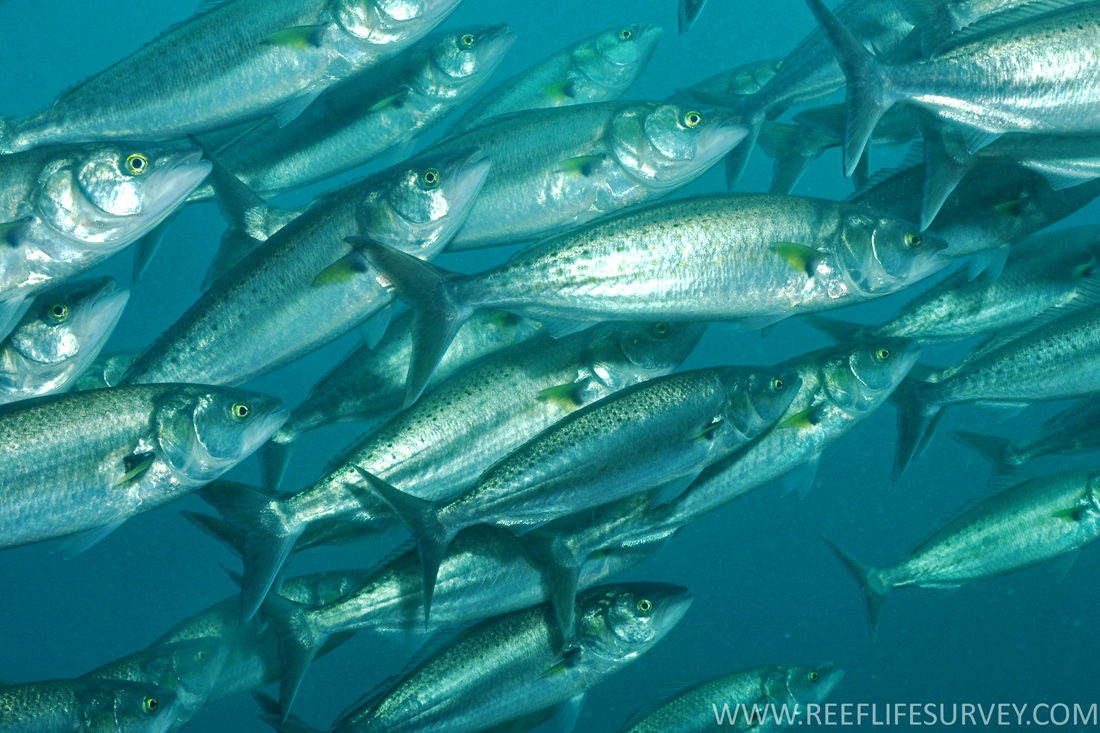

Scientific classification
- Kingdom: Animalia
- Phylum: Chordata
- Class: Actinopterygii
- Division: Teleostei
- Order: Scombriformes
- Family: Arripidae
- Genus: Arripis
- Species: A. truttacea

Binomial name
- Arripis truttacea (Cuvier, 1829)

Synonyms
- Centropristis truttaceus Cuvier, 1829; Sciaena truttaceus (Cuvier, 1829); Arripis esper Whitley, 1951

= Arripis truttacea =

Species of marine ray-finned fish

Arripis truttacea, the Western Australian salmon, is a species of marine ray-finned fish within the genus Arripis, the only genus within the family Arripidae. It is endemic to the seas off southern Australia.

== Description ==
Arripis truttacea has a streamlined, moderately deep, slightly elongate body which is a little compressed with a relatively narrow caudal peduncle and a moderately small head. The eyes are quite small with an obvious growth of transparent adipose tissue on the anterior and posterior edges of the eye on larger fish. There is a series of fine serrations along the lower edge of the preorbital bone but these largely disappear in larger fish. The mouth is moderate in size and is oblique, its maxillae reaches a level below the centre of eyes. There is a narrow band of small pointed teeth in each jaw. The body, except for the lower jaw, snout and area above the eyes is covered with moderately small, very finely ctenoid and larger specimens feel smooth to the touch. The lateral line is almost straight. There is a long dorsal fin which has a slight notch separating the spiny and soft-rayed parts of the fin and the spiny part is markedly higher than the soft-rayed part. It has a small anal fin which is about half the length of the soft part of the dorsal fin. It has a deeply forked tail. The adults have a greyish green to steely blue back and normally have yellow to slate grey spots and they are silvery white on the underparts. The pectoral fin is pale yellowish and the other fins are translucent. The juveniles are similar to the adults but have more numerous spots and have dark margins to the fins. The spiny part of the dorsal fin contains 9 spines and 15-19 soft rays while the anal fin has 3 spines and 9 - 10 soft rays. The maximum standard length of 96 centimetres (38 in) although the more usual length is 65 centimetres (26 in) and the maximum published weight is 10.5 kilograms (23 lb). The most consistent difference between this species and Arripis trutta is the gill raker count, A. truttacea has 25-31 gill rakers and A trutta has 33–40.

== Distribution ==
Arripis truttacea is endemic to the coastal waters of southern Australia where it is found from Lakes Entrance in Victoria to Kalbarri in Western Australia, although it is rare north of Lancelin in Western Australia.

== Habitat and biology ==
Arripis truttacea adults gather in large schools along exposed beaches and rocky reefs while the juveniles use shallow bays and estuaries for nursery areas, the juvenils are frequently recorded in beds of Posidonia sea grass and in creeks lined with mangroves of the genus Avicennia. The schools of adults may also be found in estuaries and in deeper offshore waters. This is a carnivorous species which preys largely on small pelagic, schooling fish, known as baitfish. In turn, it is preyed on by seals, dolphins and sharks.

The Western Australian salmon arrive off south western Australia from March onwards to spawn, mainly congregating in the waters between lying between Cape Leeuwin and Busselton in late autumn and early winter. Their arrival coincides with the peak of the strength of the eastward flowing Leeuwin Current and associated easterly winds. These then carry the newly hatched larval fish southeastwards. The larvae settle all along the southern coast of Australia but the majority are transported to the waters off Victoria and Tasmania. They mature in the nursery grounds which are situated between South Australia and Tasmania for a period of three to four years before migrating west to Western Australia, occurring in schools in the vicinity of Hopetoun and Esperance. Once the run of spawning is over, in mid-winter, the adults move back to the south-eastern Western Australian waters.

== Fisheries ==
Arripis truttacea is an important species for commercial fisheries off the south coast of Western Australia where it has been a quarry for beach seiners since 1940. The fisheries is controlled by the South Coast Salmon Managed Fishery and South West Coast Salmon Managed Fishery and these bodies issue licences to commercial fisheries, in 2019 a total of 24 licences were issued by these bodies. The catch is considered to be sustainable, The Western Australian salmon has a reputation as a good fighter and is a popular quarry for recreation fishermen, normally from rocky coasts or beaches but also from boats. There are bag limits in place and licences are required to catch them from powered boats for anglers. The flesh of A. truttacea is considered to have a strong flavour, to be a little oily, coarse and soft which means that it is not held in high esteem as a food fish so most of the commercial landings go to canning.

== Taxonomy and etymology ==
Arripis truttacea was first formally described as Centropristis truttaceus in 1829 by George Cuvier with the type locality being given as Port Western, Victoria. The specific name is given by some authorities as truttaceus but since this species was placed in the genus Arripis then the feminine form should be used as Arripis is feminine. Although the common name calls it a "salmon" it is unrelated to the true salmons of the family Salmonidae and it is one of four species in the genus Arripis from the monogeneric family Arripidae, a group of scombriforms endemic to Australia and New Zealand. Other colloquial names for this species include bay trout, blackback, buck salmon, cockie salmon, colonial salmon, jack salmon, jacky, kahawais, lumpy, ocean trout, poundies, salmon trout, Southern Australian salmon and trout.
