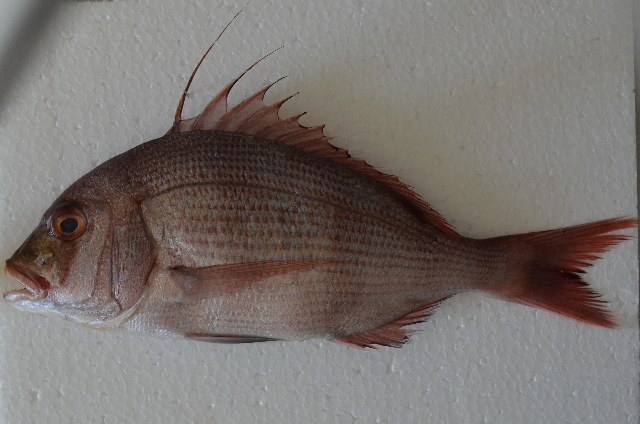

Conservation status
- Data Deficient (IUCN 3.1)

Scientific classification
- Kingdom: Animalia
- Phylum: Chordata
- Class: Actinopterygii
- Order: Acanthuriformes
- Family: Sparidae
- Genus: Cheimerius; J. L. B. Smith, 1938
- Species: C. nufar

Binomial name
- Cheimerius nufar (Valenciennes, 1830)

Synonyms
- Dentex albus Gilchrist, 1914; Dentex miles Gilchrist & W. W. Thompson, 1908; Dentex fasciolatus Valenciennes, 1830; Dentex nufar Valenciennes, 1830; Dentex variabilis Valenciennes, 1830

= Cheimerius =

Genus of fishes

Cheimerius is a monospecific genus of marine ray-finned fish belonging to the family Sparidae, the seabreams and porgies. The only species in the genus is Cheimerius nufar, the santer seabream, santer or soldier, of the Indian Ocean.

== Taxonomy ==
Cheimerius was first proposed as a genus in 1938 by the South African ichthyologist James Leonard Brierley Smith, Smith designated its only species, Dentex nufar, as its type species. Dentex nufar was first formally described in 1830 by the French zoologist Achille Valenciennes with its type locality given as Egypt and Massawa, Eritrea, on the Red Sea. The genus Cheimerius is placed in the family Sparidae within the order Spariformes by the 5th edition of Fishes of the World. Some authorities classify this genus in the subfamily Denticinae, but the 5th edition of Fishes of the World does not recognise subfamilies within the Sparidae.

== Etymology ==
Cheimerius suffixes cheima, which means "storm", with -ius, an adjectival suffix. IN South Africa this fish appears in estuaries prior to storms at sea, and in calm weather it is absent from these areas. Smith wrote that if this fish is "taken in nets, one may be certain of a storm at sea within twenty-four hours". The specific name nufar is the name given to this fish by fishers at Massawa.

== Description ==
Cheimerius have an oval shaped body, albeit slightly elongated, which has a standard length which is between 2.2 and 2,5 times its depth. The dorsal fin is supported by 11 or 12 spines, with the first 2 spines being the shortest and the 3rd and 4th spines being the longest, and 10 or 11 soft rays. The anal fin contains 3 spines and 8 soft rays. The first fin ray in the pelvic fin is elongated. The dorsal profile of the head is convex. The front of each jaw bear 4-6 canine-like teeth with bands of bristle-like teeth behind them but there are no molar-like teeth. The body is pinkish above and whitish below with six or seven indistinct, dark, vertical bars along the back on juveniles. These fade and disappear as the fish matures. The santer bream has a maximum published total length of 75 cm (30 in) but 30 cm (12 in) is more typical.

== Distribution and habitat ==
Cheimerius is found in the Western Indian Ocean. It occurs along the coast of eastern Africa from the Gulf of Suez and Gulf of Aqaba south to Mossel Bay in the Western Cape, South Africa. It also occurs around Madagasccar, Réunion and Mauritius, as well as in the Persian Gulf, Gulf of Oman and from Pakistan along the western coast of India to Sri Lanka. It is found over rocky substrates at depths between 60 and 100 m (200 and 330 ft) with juveniles seeking protection in estuaries at the approach of stormy weather.

== Biology ==
Cheimerius adults occur in loose schools mainly above deeper, rather falt reefs while juveniles are found in shallow reefs and over sand adjacent to reefs at depths between 7 and 60 m (23 and 197 ft). The eggs and larvae of the santer seabream are distributed inshore of the Agulhas Current along the eastern coast of South Africa. The adults apparently do not travel on extensive migrations, although, they do seem to be nomadic, moving from one reef complex to another, but they have been recorded undertaking local migrations into shallow water at the approach of stormy weather or in the aftermath cold water upwellings. The main prey of this fish is other fishes and squid. The males have some ovarian tissue but this species is thought to be mainly gonochoristic, although there is some evidence for protogyny. Off Oman spawning was observed twice a year with the primary spawning season occurring in July to August and coinciding with the monsoon, the secondary season running from May to June.

== Fisheries and conservation ==
Cheimerius is an important target species for commercial fisheries wherever it occurs, and in some areas for recreational fisheries too. The larvae have been raised in aquaculture settings. The IUCN classify this species as Data deficient because in some areas, such as Mozambique, there is evidence of overfishing and there is insufficient data on its total population.
