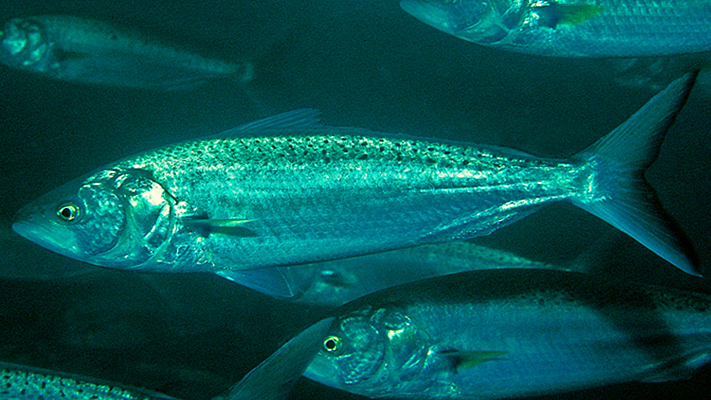

Scientific classification
- Kingdom: Animalia
- Phylum: Chordata
- Class: Actinopterygii
- Order: Scombriformes
- Family: Arripidae
- Genus: Arripis
- Species: A. trutta

Binomial name
- Arripis trutta (J. R. Forster, 1801)

Synonyms
- Sciaena trutta Forster, 1801; Perca trutta Bosc, 1802; Perca marginata Cuvier, 1828; Arripis salar (Richardson, 1839); Centropristes sapidissimus Richardson, 1842; Centropristes tasmanicus Hombron & Jacquinot, 1853

= Arripis trutta =

Species of ray-finned fish

Arripis trutta, known as the Australian salmon in Australia and as kahawai in New Zealand, is a South Pacific marine fish and one of the four extant species within the genus Arripis, native to the cooler waters around the southeastern Australian coasts and the New Zealand coastline. Other common names for this species include Eastern Australian salmon, Eastern Australian mackerel, bay trout, blackback salmon (or just "black back"), buck salmon (or "buck"), cocky salmon, colonial salmon, woolley Judith, newfish and salmon trout.

Although it is referred to as "salmon" in Australian English and its species epithet trutta is Latin for trout, it is not related to true salmons or trouts, which belong to the family Salmonidae of the order Salmoniformes. All Arripis species belong to the family Arripidae of the order Scombriformes.

== Taxonomy ==
Arripis trutta was first formally described in 1801 as Sciaena trutta by Marcus Elieser Bloch and Johann Gottlob Theaenus Schneider with the type locality given as Cook Strait.

== Description ==
Arripis trutta is a streamlined fish with a long and slender body. There is a bony ridge edge of bone beneath and in front of each eye which has obvious serrations in smaller individuals. In larger fish the scales feel smooth. The lobes of the caudal fin are equivalent in length to the head. These fish are dark bluish-green dorsally and silvery white ventrally. The juveniles have golden bars on their upper flanks and these break up into large spots as the fish matures. The pectoral fin is vivid yellow and the caudal and spiny part of the dorsal fin both have a blackish margin. There are 9 spines and 15–17 soft rays in the dorsal fin and 3 spines and 9–10 soft rays in the anal fin. The maximum total length recorded is 89 centimetres (35 in) although they are commonly a total length of around 47 centimetres (19 in) and the maximum recorded weight is 9.4 kilograms (21 lb). The most consistent difference between this species and Arripis truttacea is the gill raker count, A. truttacea has 25–31 gill rakers and A trutta has 33–40.

Arripis trutta can differentiated from Arripis xylabion, as the former has a larger tail.

== Distribution ==
Arripis trutta is found in the southwestern Pacific Ocean mostly around the littoral waters of the Tasman Sea and Bass Strait. In Australia, they are found from Moreton Bay in Queensland to western Victoria and northern Tasmania, with infrequent records at Kangaroo Island in South Australia. They are also found around Lord Howe Island and Norfolk Island in the open waters of the Tasman Sea. In New Zealand, they are distributed around the coasts but are more common north of Kaikōura on the South Island. They are also found around the Chatham Islands and Kermadec Islands east of New Zealand.

== Habitat and biology ==
Arripis trutta is a migratory fish that may swim long distances, sometimes thousands of kilometres. The adults congregate and form very large schools off oceanic beaches and exposed coasts coastal areas, and will enter rivers. The juveniles live in smaller schools in more sheltered areas such as bays and estuaries, and these mostly occur in the more southerly areas in which this species occurs. It is carnivorous and feeds mainly on small pelagic fish and crustaceans such as krill. They are highly visual predators, preying on a diverse variety which eat a variety of crustaceans and polychaetes during their juvenile phase, however, adults shift their preferred prey to small schooling baitfish such as pilchards, sprats and anchovies. There is some evidence that the diet of A. trutta has undergone a marked shift since the late 20th century, studies conducted during 1950s and 1960s found that the adults fed largely on krill and squid, which are animals associated with cooler waters. Studies during the early 21st century have shown that the main prey taken is small pelagic baitfish. It is thought that this shift is a result of long-term changes in the East Australian Current which brings warmer waters from the Coral Sea and has extended farther south since the 1990s. It is further thought that this "multi-decadal southward penetration of the EAC" is one of the more obvious indications of global warming and the recorded change in the diet of A trutta forms a biological record of oceanic warming.

Arripis trutta are preyed on by larger marine predators such as seals, dolphins and sharks. The feeding schools push the smaller fish they are preying on towards the surface, making them accessible to seabirds, In this way, this species has an important ecological role in facilitating transfer of energy among the upper levels of the pelagic food chain in inshore ecosystems. An example is the white-fronted tern (Sterna striata) which has the colloquial name "kahawai bird" because often feeds on shoaling fish in association with kahawai, gulls and shearwaters. Fishers hunting for schools of kahawai to troll look out for the flocks of white-fronted terns feeding in association with the predatory fish.

The Australian population of this species spawns in the surf zone between Lakes Entrance in southeastern Victoria and Bermagui in New South Wales South Coast in the late spring and summer. They first spawn when they are around four years old and have attained a length of 39 centimetres (15 in) They can live for up to 26 years.

== In a human context ==
Arripis trutta is a major traditional food for Māori. Many tribes would migrate to river mouths in summer months, when kahawai would swarm. Kahawai could be caught using flecks of iridescent pāua shells, or by using a pā kahawai, a specialised hook that incorporated pāua shell in the design. The name kahawai is specific to Māori language, as the word is not used for any similar species of fish across Polynesia.

Early European settlers to New Zealand did not like the fish, describing it as dry, coarse and flavourless. Over time the fish grew in popularity, and is now one of the most caught recreational fish in the country.

=== Fisheries ===
Arripis trutta are caught in coastal waters, frequently in the vicinity of estuaries and off coastal beaches. Most of the commercial landings are caught using purse seines and spotter planes may be used to find the large schools They may also be taken as bycatch of purse seine and trawl fisheries pursuing other schooling species like snapper, mackerel and trevally. Although they are fished for throughout southern Australia, the main landings are in southern New South Wales and Eastern Victoria. The flesh of this species is not very popular with consumers and a high proportion of the landings have been used as pet-food or bait. In New Zealand the principal commercial fishing areas are north of Kaikōura in the South Island, off the coast of North Island and in the Cook Strait. Fisheries New Zealand manages that nation's fishery to maintain the population of A trutta at roughly 52% of the stock which was present before modern commercial fisheries began and in 2019 the population was well above that target.

==== Recreational fisheries ====
Arripis trutta are highly prized by recreational fishers, especially for anglers fishing from beaches and rocks. Anglers tend to catch this species using light tackle or by fly fishing and it is said to be a "sporting catch".
