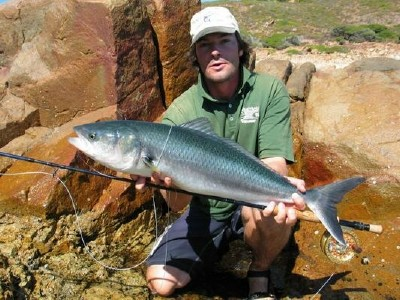
- Australian salmon (A. trutta)

Scientific classification
- Kingdom: Animalia
- Phylum: Chordata
- Class: Actinopterygii
- Division: Teleostei
- Order: Scombriformes
- Family: Arripidae; Gill, 1893
- Genus: Arripis; Jenyns, 1840

Type species
- Arripis trutta J. R. Forster, 1801

Synonyms
- Deuteropterus Gill, 1861; Homodon Brisout de Barneville, 1847; Lepidomegas Thominot, 1880; Mulloides Richardson, 1843

= Arripis =

Genus of ray-finned fishes

Arripis is a genus of marine ray-finned fishes from Australia and New Zealand, known as Australian salmon, kahawai and Australian herring. They are the only members of the family Arripidae. Despite the common name, Australian salmon are not related to the salmon family Salmonidae of the Northern Hemisphere, just as Australian herring are not related to herring of the Northern Hemisphere, but belong to the order Scombriformes of mackerel-like fishes. Australian salmon were named so by early European settlers after their superficial resemblance to salmonids.

Relatively long-lived fish, Australian salmon are a favoured target of recreational fishers, and both commercial and traditional Māori fisheries. They are also common bycatch of the Australasian snapper (Pagrus auratus), mullet (Mugilidae), white trevally (Pseudocaranx dentex), and mackerel (Scombridae) fisheries. These species are all taken in great numbers by way of purse seine nets and trawling. They are also caught by skilled fishermen along the southern coastline of Australia by beach seining.

== Species and range ==
Four recognised species are in this genus. The ranges of the species may overlap to some extent, but can be described as:

| Image | Scientific name | Common name | Distribution |
|---|---|---|---|
| | Arripis georgianus (Valenciennes, 1831) | ruff, tommy ruff, Australian ruff, Australian herring | Gippsland Lakes, Victoria to Shark Bay, Western Australia |
| | Arripis trutta (J. R. Forster, 1801) | Australian salmon, eastern Australian salmon, kahawai | From western Victoria to New Zealand, including the islands of Tasmania, Lord Howe, and Norfolk |
| | Arripis truttaceus (G. Cuvier, 1829) | western Australian salmon | Western Australia to Victoria and Tasmania |
| | Arripis xylabion Paulin, 1993 | northern kahawai, Kermadec kahawai | New Zealand, west to Lord Howe, Norfolk, and Kermadec Islands |

== Description ==
A streamlined, fusiform body and large, powerful forked tail – the upper lobe of which is equal to or less than the length of the head in the eastern Australian salmon – are indications of the fast-paced pelagic lives these fish lead. Upon dissection, the extremely large, dense gills (for maximum oxygen extraction) and large proportion of red aerobic muscle in the 'fillets' is further evidence of a fast-paced pelagic life. The first (spinous, with 9 spines) dorsal fin originates behind the pectoral fins, the former being confluent with, but noticeably higher than the much longer soft dorsal fin (with 15–19 rays), itself much longer than the anal fin (which has three spines and 9–10 soft rays). The pelvic fin is situated in a thoracic position.

Scales and eyes are relatively large – in the Australian herring, the eyes are approximately one-fifth the length of the head in diameter. The large mouth is terminal, and the jaws are lined with bands of sharp villiform (brushlike) teeth. The lateral line runs along the upper sides of the body.

The western Australian salmon is the largest species at a maximum 96 cm (38 in) standard length (that is, excluding the caudal fin) and 10.5 kg (23 lb) in weight. The Australian herring is the smallest species at maximum 41 cm (16 in) fork length (that is, from the snout to the middle of the caudal fin's fork) and 800 g (28 oz). Australian salmon share a passing resemblance to the unrelated yellowtail amberjack, (Seriola lalandi), locally known as "kingfish", with which larger Australian salmon are sometimes confused.

All species are strongly countershaded; dorsal colours range from dark blue-green in A. trutta, green in A. georgianus, and steel-blue to grayish- or greenish-black in A. truttaceus; the colours fade to a silver-white ventrally. A smattering of yellow, gray, or blackish spots embellishes the dorsal half, the spots arranged vertically or longitudinally in a series of rows. There are marked differences in subadult coloration: for example, on the flanks of juvenile Australian herring are a series of dark golden vertical bars.

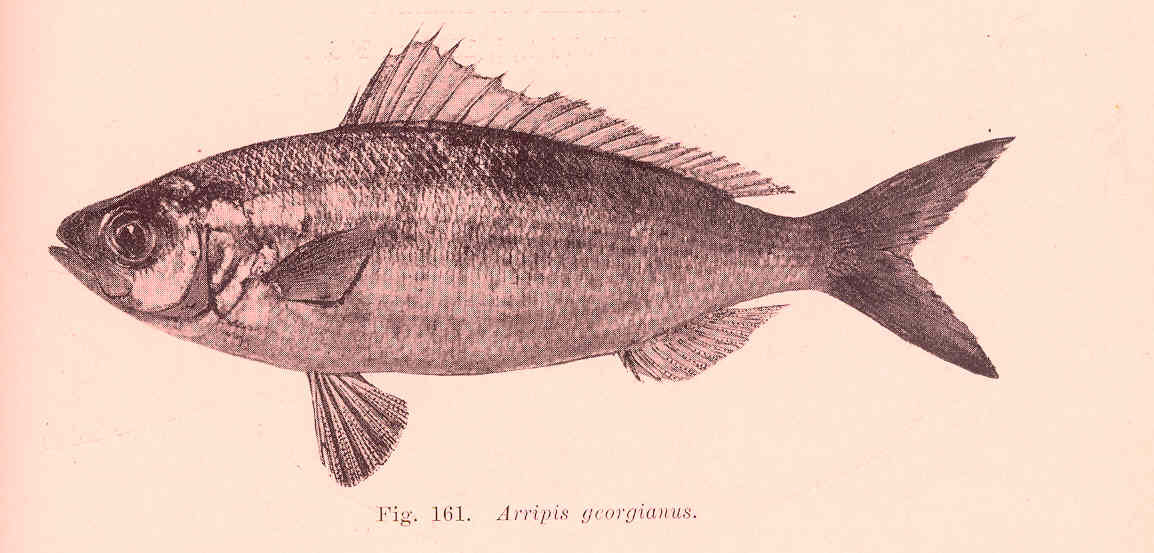
Arripis georgianus

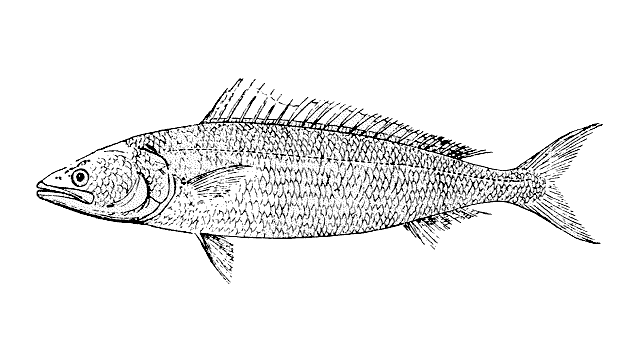
A. trutta

== Reproduction ==
Although their reproduction is poorly studied, Australian salmon are all known to be "pelagic spawners"; that is, they spawn in open water during the austral spring, releasing a large number of tiny (1 mm in diameter), smooth spherical eggs made buoyant by lipid droplets. The eggs (and later the larvae), which possess an unsegmented yolk, become part of the zooplankton, drifting at the mercy of the currents until the larvae develop and settle. The young Australian salmon then spend the first two to five years in sheltered coastal bays, inlets, and estuaries until they become sexually mature and begin to move into more open waters. Relatively long-lived fishes, Australian salmon may attain an age of 26 yr in Arripis trutta and 7–9 yr in other species.

All species are oceanic spawners. Reports of A. trutta being anadromous and spawning in freshwater are not correct; this may be due to confusion with sea-run specimens of exotic brown trout, (Salmo trutta), or anadromous populations of native spotted galaxias, (Galaxias truttaceus).

A. georgianus is thought – due to females retaining both ripe and unripe eggs – to be "partial spawners"; that is, they may spawn over a long period with no real peaks. In contrast, A. trutta and A. truttaceus are thought to be "serial batch spawners", completing their spawning season after a series of small "burst" spawnings.

== Ecology ==
All species are neritic and epipelagic, staying within the upper layers of relatively shallow (1–80 m), open and clear coastal waters (although the western Australian salmon may prefer deeper water). The turbulent surf zone of beaches, rocky reefs, bays, and brackish waters such as estuaries are also frequented, and some species may also enter rivers. Juveniles inhabit estuaries and mangroves, as well as sheltered bays with soft bottoms carpeted with seagrasses. Adults undertake seasonal migrations over vast distances, moving into deeper water during winter months. The evolutionary history of the species of Arripis has been shaped by changes to oceanographic conditions and land-bridges that occurred during glacial cycles.

Australian salmon form immense schools with hundreds to thousands of individuals, as both adults and juveniles. They are carnivorous and feed primarily on small fish, such as pilchard (Clupeidae); crustaceans such as krill (Euphausiacea), copepods, and other zooplankton (the latter comprising the bulk of the juvenile diets). The zoobenthos is also sampled to some extent, with primarily shellfish, crabs, and annelid worms eaten. The Australian salmon are very fast swimmers, and are sometimes seen mingling with ostensibly similar species of carangids, such as trevally; this is an example of mutualism.

Together with the carangids, Australian salmon feed en masse by co-operatively bullying baitfish up to the surface; this herding technique is exploited by seabirds which are quickly attracted to, and feed upon, the foaming mass of fish at the surface. This commensal relationship between the Australian salmon and the birds is noted to be especially strong in such species as the white-fronted tern, (Sterna striata), fluttering shearwater, (Puffinus gavia), and Buller's shearwater, (Puffinus bulleri). The baitfish made available by the Australian salmon's herding behaviour may also be important to the reproductive success of winter-nesting birds; the decline of the Australians salmon stocks has evoked concern for these bird species, some of which – such as the fairy tern, (Sterna nereis) – are endangered

Aside from seabirds, the Australian salmon are also important in the diets of cetaceans, such as killer whales (Orcinus orca) and bottlenose dolphins (Tursiops truncatus & T. aduncus); several species of large sharks, for example; great white (Carcharodon carcharias), dusky (Carcharhinus obscurus), copper (Carcharhinus brachyurus), and sand tiger (Carcharias taurus) sharks; and eared seals such as the Australian sea lion (Neophoca cinerea).

== Diet ==
Arripis trutta is principally a pelagic feeder, which however occasionally feeds from the sea bottom, demonstrating a pragmatic approach to their diet as it appears they feed on those fishes which are locally abundant such as shoals of small fish on which preys. Small kahawai below 100mm in length mainly eat copepods and planktonic crustaceans. This was derived from the analysis of 326 stomachs of the kahawai from Wellington Harbour, which exhibited that the fish is a voracious carnivore which feeds mainly on fishes and to a lesser extent on planktonic crustaceans.

== Importance to humans ==
Australian Salmon contains significant amounts of blood in the fillet and under the skin which if not removed results in a strong flavoured flesh that is unappealing to many consumers. However when bled immediately after capture and filleted properly to remove all traces of blood the resulting flesh is white, neutral flavoured and excellent to eat. What is not sold for human consumption is used as bait for rock lobster (Palinuridae) traps and other commercial and recreational fishing. The Australian salmon fetch no more than a few dollars (AU) per kilogram; nonetheless, large numbers are taken via purse seine nets (and to a lesser extent trawling, hauling, gill, and trap nets) annually; the reported 2002–2003 commercial New Zealand catch of kahawai was 2,900 tonnes. Such reported catches do not include the untold tonnes taken as bycatch from operations targeting more highly valued species. Low-flying planes are used to locate and target sizeable Australian salmon schools, and critics have cited this practice as a means by the industry to artificially inflate catch records (which would give a false impression of abundance). Australian salmon numbers have declined noticeably however, with large specimens becoming ever rarer; the fish have all but disappeared from some areas. On October 1, 2004, the New Zealand Ministry of Fisheries included kahawai under its Quota Management System, setting a catch limit of 3,035 tonnes for the season. This was a 5% increase over the previous two years, despite the government's intention of lowering catch limits.

In New Zealand, Australian salmon and in particular northern kahawai are highly regarded for their flesh when hot smoked by recreational fisherman, usually using manuka sawdust or woodchips. Australian salmon prepared in this manner are available in many New Zealand supermarkets and fishmongers. The flesh is usually eaten hot, or broken up and used in fish pie.

The Māori of New Zealand, to whom the fish are known by their name kahawai, koopuuhuri, and kooukauka, fish in subsistence and customary capacities. The fish were (and are) caught with lines of flax fibre and elaborate hooks of bone, wood, shell such as paua, or stone. The fish are filleted before being hung on racks to dry. Recreational fishers also seek Australian salmon for their renowned mettle when hooked; the fish are a challenge to land and often jump, occasionally standing on their tails. A significant number are taken for sport.

No records of total recreational catches are kept. In Western Australia, boat-based fishers caught about 20 tons in 2020/2021; shore-based catch is unknown. In South Australia, the catch was about 40 tons in 2021/2022. Catches in Victoria and New South Wales are unknown.

Commercial fishing practices undertaken across Australia and New Zealand have been highly criticised in various recreational fishing magazines as being excessive. Many high-profile anglers, such as those on Fishing WA, have made statements that the commercial fish catch in Western Australia and Australia in general is beyond the scope necessary for human and animal consumption, and that they are far more valuable as a recreational fish species. The ease of catching Australian salmon, which tend to form schools of several tonnes, has meant recreational fishers are finding fewer of these species in inshore waters during the season (the migration patterns of Australian salmon mean they come into warmer waters during the autumn).
