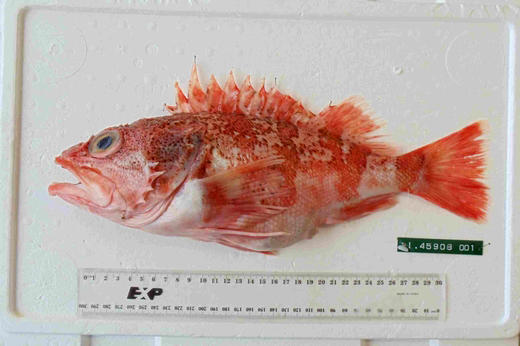
- A Bigeye Ocean Perch, Helicolenus barathri, from the Derwent Hunter Seamount, New South Wales, August 2012

Scientific classification
- Kingdom: Animalia
- Phylum: Chordata
- Class: Actinopterygii
- Division: Teleostei
- Order: Perciformes
- Family: Scorpaenidae
- Genus: Helicolenus
- Species: H. barathri

Binomial name
- Helicolenus barathri (Hector, 1875)

Synonyms
- Scorpaena barathri Hector, 1875

= Helicolenus barathri =

Species of fish

Helicolenus barathri, the bigeye sea perch, bigeye ocean perch, coral cod, coral perch, red gurnard perch, red perch or red rock perch, is a species of marine ray-finned fish belonging to the subfamily Sebastinae, part of the family Scorpaenidae. It is found in the southwestern Pacific Ocean.

== Taxonomy ==
Helicolenus barathri was first formally described in 1875 as Scorpaena barathri by the Scottish geologist, naturalist and surgeon James Hector with the type locality given as off Cape Farewell in New Zealand. This species has been considered to be a synonym of Helicolenus percoides. The specific name barathri means "of the abyss" (barathrum), Hector did not explain the allusion which may refer to the type being dredged up from 732 m (2,402 ft).

== Description ==
Helicenus barathri has a moderately large, relatively smooth head which is roughly two-fifths of its standard length. It has large eyes that remain but these do not bulge over the head. There are 5 preopercular spines. The pelvic fins are very large, extending beyond the anus. The dorsal fin has 12 spines and 12 to 14 soft rays while the anal fin has 3 spines and 5 soft rays. The maximum known standard length of this species is 36.5 cm (14.4 in). The colour of the upper body is pink to red marked with indistinct darker bands and speckling, which sometimes form irregular lines. The lower body is pale pink or white. The base of the pectoral fins and the abdomen may be silvery.

=== Identification ===
Helicolenus barathri is distinguished from H. percoides by having larger eyes which have a diameter equal to 34-41% of the length of the head and that there are normally 13-14 soft rays in the dorsal fin, whereas the eye diameter of H percoides is equal to 27-33% of the length of the head and it normally has 11-12 soft fin rays in its dorsal fin.

== Distribution and habitat ==
Helicolenus barathri is found in the southwestern Pacific Ocean which occurs off eastern Australia from Brisbane south to Tasmania and eastern South Australia. It also occurs in the Tasman Sea over sea mounts, off Norfolk Island and Lord Howe Island, as well as off New Zealand and the Chatham Islands. This is a benthic species inhabiting flat, hard substrates in the upper waters of the continental slope waters on seamounts, ridges and rises.

== Biology ==
Helicolenus barathri is an ovoviviparous fish which the small larvae being born live into floating gelatinous masses during their long spawning season. These fish feed opportunistically on or close to the substrate. They prey on large benthic invertebrates such as cephalopods and crustaceans, as well as small fishes. The reach sexual maturity at 5 years old and spawn in winter, possibly in July. The spines in the dorsal fin are venomous.

== Fisheries ==
Helicolenus barathri is an important species for commercial fisheries with white meat that is mild tasting. The catch is managed jointly with that of H. percoides with a combined catch limit in Australian waters of 318 tonnes in 2026/27.
