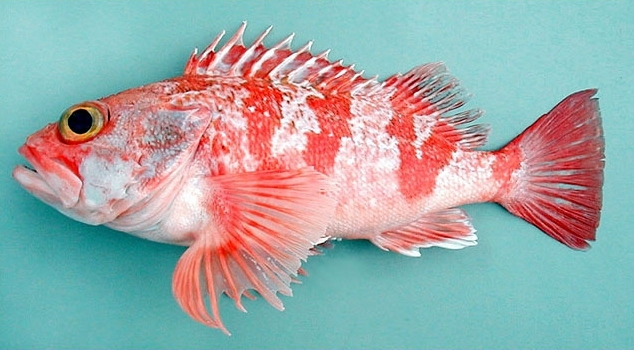

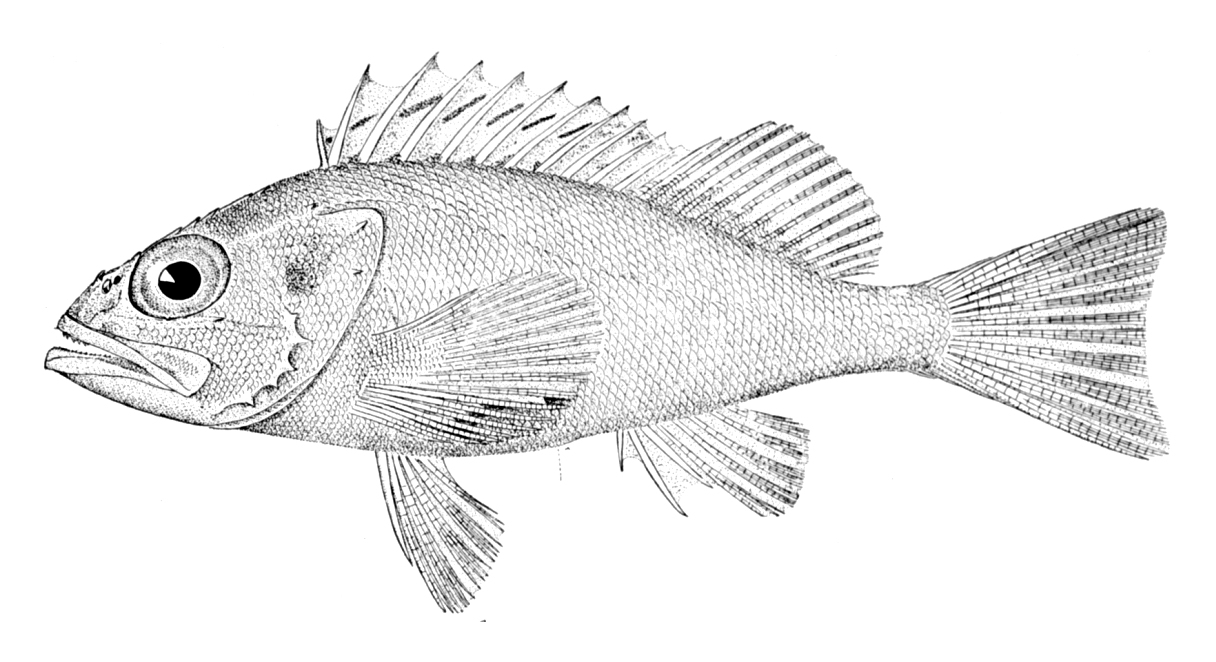

Conservation status
- Least Concern (IUCN 3.1)

Scientific classification
- Kingdom: Animalia
- Phylum: Chordata
- Class: Actinopterygii
- Order: Perciformes
- Family: Scorpaenidae
- Genus: Helicolenus
- Species: H. dactylopterus

Binomial name
- Helicolenus dactylopterus (Delaroche, 1809)

Synonyms
- Scorpaena dactyloptera Delaroche, 1809; Sebastes dactylopterus (Delaroche, 1809); Sebastes maculatus Cuvier, 1829; Helicolenus maculatus (Cuvier, 1829); Sebastes imperialis Cuvier, 1829; Helicolenus imperialis (Cuvier, 1829); Helicolenus maderensis Goode & Bean, 1896; Helicolenus thelmae Fowler, 1937

= Helicolenus dactylopterus =

Species of fish

Helicolenus dactylopterus, blackbelly rosefish, bluemouth rockfish, and bluemouth seaperch, is a species of marine ray-finned fish belonging to the subfamily Sebastinae which is classified within the family Scorpaenidae. This Atlantic species is a typical sit-and-wait predator with a highly cryptic coloration.

== Taxonomy ==
Helicolenus dactylopterus Was first formally described in 1809 as Scorpaena dactyloptera by the Genevan naturalist François-Étienne de La Roche with the type locality given as Ibiza in the Balearic Islands. When George Brown Goode and Tarleton Hoffman Bean described the genus Helicolenus in 1896 they designated this species as its type species. The specific name is a compound of dactylos which means "finger" and pterus meaning "finned", an allusion to the lower rays of the pectoral fin, which have tendril-like tips which extend beyond the fin membrane.

== Distribution ==
Helicolenus dactylopterus is widely distributed in the Atlantic Ocean. In the west, it ranges from Nova Scotia to Venezuela. In the east, it ranges from Iceland and Norway to South Africa, including the Azores, Madeira and Canary Islands, and the entire Mediterranean Sea.

== Biology ==
The blackbelly rosefish is a bathydemersal scorpionfish, found in soft bottom areas of the continental shelf and upper slope. They have been recorded at depths between 50 and 1,100 m (160 and 3,610 ft), but usually from 150 to 600 m (490 to 1,970 ft). They feed on both benthic and pelagic organisms including decapod crustaceans, fishes, cephalopods and sometimes pyrosomes, polychaetes and echinoderms. The proportions of these prey types in their diet vary according to the size of the fish.

== Description ==
=== Size / weight / age ===
Males reach a greater length and weight than females with the same age.

Max. length recorded: 47.0 cm TL;

Common length: 25.0 cm TL;

Max. published weight: 1,550 g;

Max. reported age: 43 years

=== Morphological description ===
Blackbelly rosefish is a robust fish, with a large head and the spination described for the genus, and without tabs or tentacles. The profile of the nape is relatively steeply inclined. It has villiform teeth on both jaws and its large mouth is dark colored inside. The dorsal fin has 11 to 13 spines (usually 12) and 10 to 14 rays (usually 11–13); the anal fin has 3 spines and 5 rays; and the pectoral fin has between 17 and 20 rays. They have 55 to 80 vertical rows of ctenoid scales and their lateral line has tubular scales; the chest, cheek and maxilla are usually scaled but the snout and ventral part of the head are naked. They usually have 25 vertebrae. Gill rakers are well developed: 7 to 9 on the upper arch, 16 to 21 on the lower arch. Their colour is variable. The back and sides are red and the belly is pink, with 5 to 6 dark bands below anterior, middle and posterior dorsal spines: below the soft dorsal rays and at the base of the caudal fin; a Y-shaped dark bar between the soft dorsal and anal fin; and usually a dark blotch on the posterior part of the spinous dorsal fin.

As with other species of scorpionfish, the spines of the blackbelly rosefish contain toxic venom and have reportedly caused injuries to humans. However, there has been little research on the venom produced by this species.

== Reproduction ==
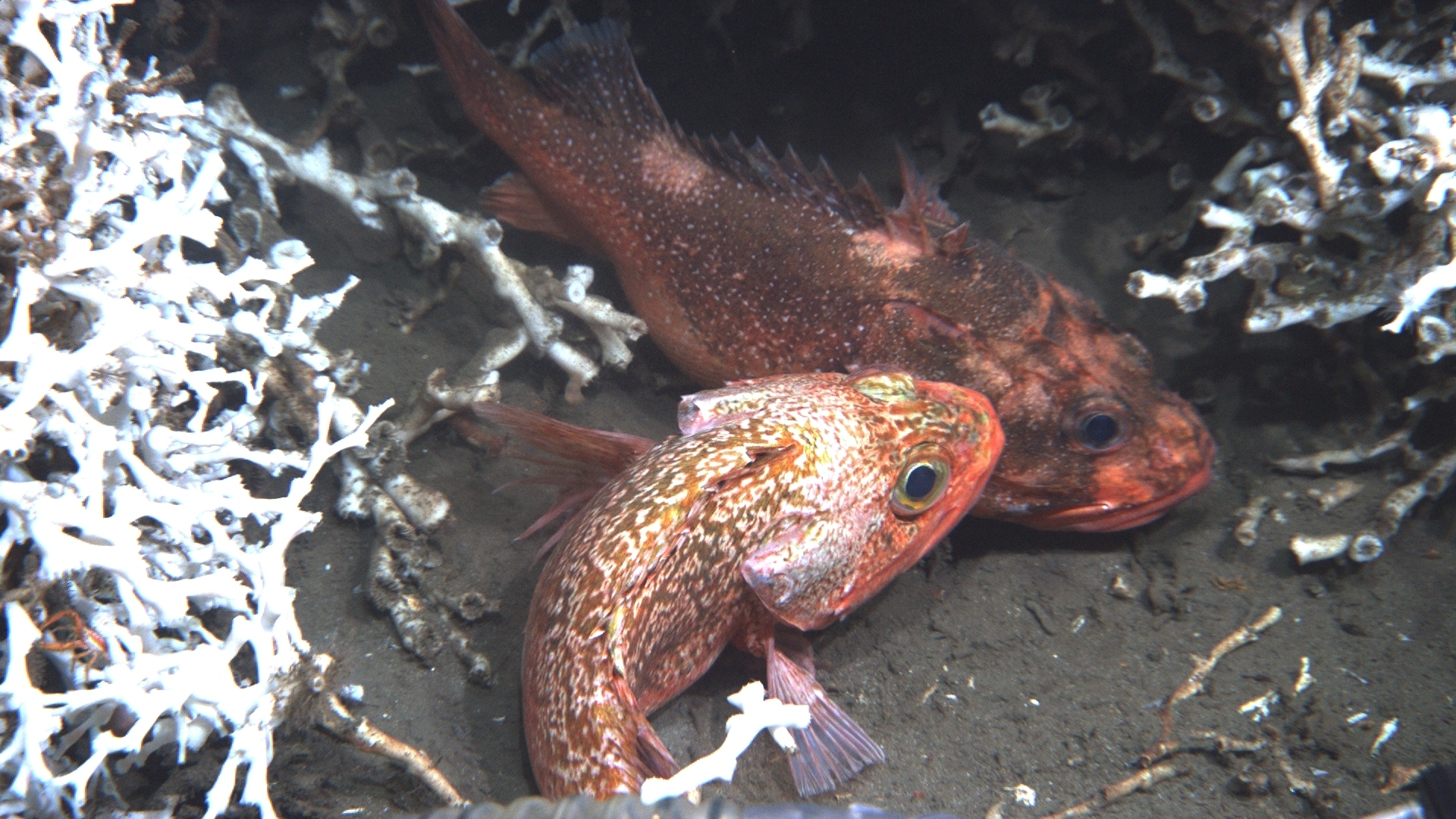
Blackbelly rosefish among Lophelia corals.

Blackbelly rosefish have intraovarian gestation. Fertilization is internal, as free spermatozoa were found primarily in resting ovaries from July through early December, with peak occurrence in September through November in the Western Atlantic. There was a delay of 1–3 months before fertilization, as oocyte development did not begin until December. Occurrence during January through April of early-celled embryos, the most advanced stage observed, and postovulatory follicles indicated that oocyte development was rapid. The females can store sperm within their ovaries that allows them to spawn multiple batches of embryos, which are enclosed within a gelatinous matrix secreted into the ovarian cavity. This species has a zygoparous form of oviparity, which occupies an intermediate position between oviparity and viviparity. Larvae and juveniles are pelagic.

=== First maturity medium length ===
Females – 20.9 cm

Males – 26.0 cm

== Stock structure ==
This species can be divided into two subspecies, taking into account the morphological characteristics: Helicolenus dactylopterus lahillei and Helicolenus dactylopterus dactylopterus. Based on H. d. dactylopterus geographical distribution, there can be considered to be four different populations: in South Africa, in the Gulf of Guinea, in the northeast (NE) Atlantic (from Norway to North Africa and the Mediterranean) and in the northwest (NW) Atlantic (Nova Scotia to Venezuela). There is another proposal that suggests further subdivision of the species into six subspecies, also based on morphological measurements and geographical distribution: H. d. dactylopterus, H. d. maderensis, H. d. maculatus, H. d. gouphensis, H. d. angolensis and H. d. lahillei.

== Fisheries ==
The blackbelly rosefish is the most commercial scorpionfish species in the Mediterranean. Although there has been little commercial interest in this species, partially due to its low level of accessibility, it is currently growing as new resources need to be found by fishing fleets due to the depletion of traditional resources.

This species is a common bycatch associated with many demersal fisheries, including the black spot seabream (Pagellus bogaraveo). It is caught by artisanal longline and gillnet fisheries near the Strait of Gibraltar, and along the Portuguese continental coast and the Azores. In the western Mediterranean, blackbelly rosefish are mostly caught as bycatch in bottom trawl fisheries targeted at deep-sea crustaceans. However, in areas such as the Catalan coast, the blackbelly rosefish is the most commercially viable scorpionfish species, with important economic value.
