= Microcotyle helotes =

Scientific classification
- Kingdom: Animalia
- Phylum: Platyhelminthes
- Class: Monogenea
- Order: Mazocraeidea
- Family: Microcotylidae
- Genus: Microcotyle
- Species: M. helotes

Binomial name
- Microcotyle helotes Sandars, 1944

Synonyms
- Microcotyle (Microcotyle) helotes (Sandars, 1944) Unnithan1971

Species of worm

Microcotyle helotes is a species of monogenean, parasitic on the gills of a marine fish. It belongs to the family Microcotylidae.

== Taxonomy ==
Microcotyle helotes was described and illustrated by Sandars (1944) based on 11 specimens from the gills of the eastern striped grunter, Helotes sexlineatus (Terapontidae) from off Safety Bay, Western Australia. Unnithan (1971) placed M. helotes in the nominal subgenus Microcotyle as Microcotyle (Microcotyle) helotes. However, this combinaison was suppressed by Mamaev in 1986. This monogenean was redescribed and illustrated by Dillon & Hargis (1985) based on 2 adults and one 1 juvenile from the type-host and locality. Although Williams (1991) recovered specimens of Microcotyle helotes from the type-host and a second Terapontidae, Pelsartia humeralis, from the type locality, he redescribed Microcotyle helotes from Pelsartia humeralis only. Minor differences were noted in the redescriptions. Williams (1991) noted that examination of a large series of specimens from both hosts showed them to be identical.

== Morphology ==
Microcotyle helotes has the general morphology of all species of Microcotyle, with a symmetrical elongated body of medium size, comprising an anterior part which contains most organs and a posterior part called the haptor. The haptor is symmetrical, and bears 62 clamps, arranged as two rows, one on each side. The clamps of the haptor attach the animal to the gill of the fish. There are also two buccal septated suckers at the anterior extremity. The digestive organs include an anterior, terminal mouth, a circular pharynx, an oesophagus dividing shortly behind the genital atrium and a posterior intestine with two lateral branches provided with numerous secondary branches; the branches extends into the haptor. Each adult contains male and female reproductive organs. The reproductive organs include an anterior genital atrium, armed with numerous minute spines, a medio-dorsal vagina, a single ovary and 14 irregular testes which are posterior to the ovary.

== Hosts and localities ==
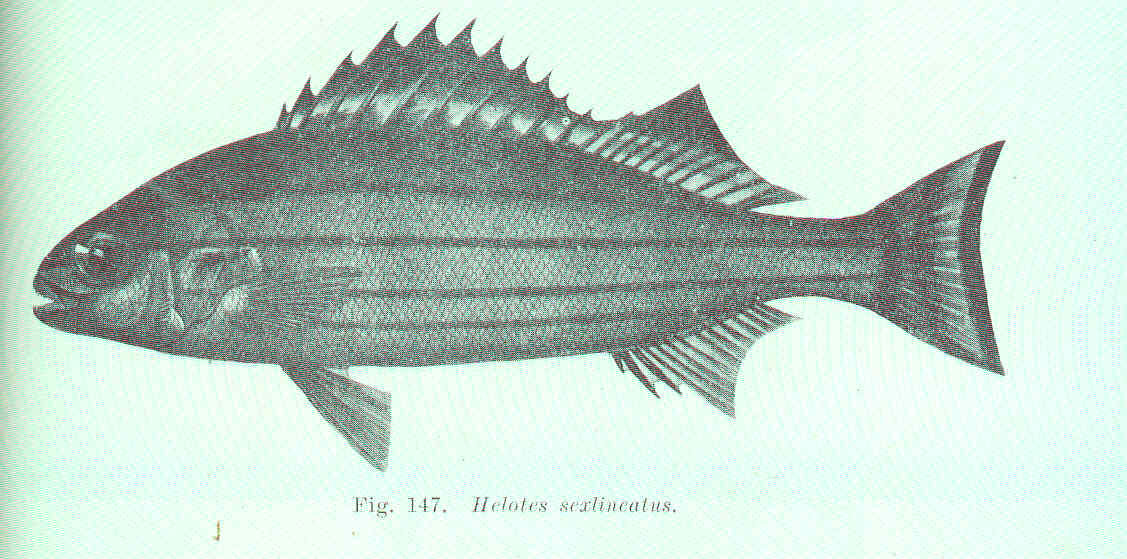
The eastern striped grunter, Helotes sexlineatus is the type host of Microcotyle helotes

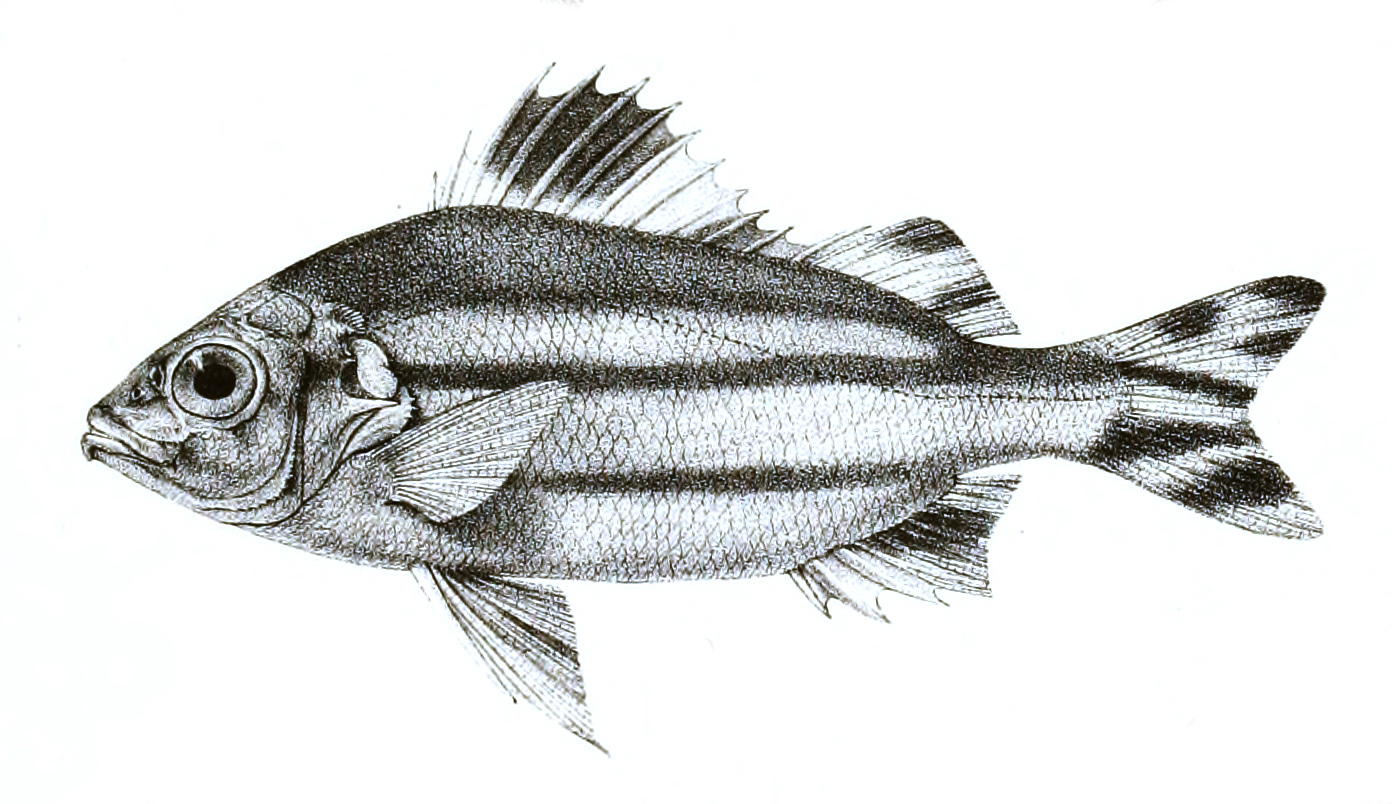
The sea trumpeter Terapon theraps is also host of Microcotyle helotes

The eastern striped grunter, Helotes sexlineatus (Terapontidae) is the type host of Microcotyle helotes. It was redescribed from others Terapontidae; Pelsartia humeralis, and the sea trumpeter Terapon theraps. Microcotyle helotes was first described from fishes caught off Western Australia. This monogenean was reported again from the type locality, and from South China Sea.
