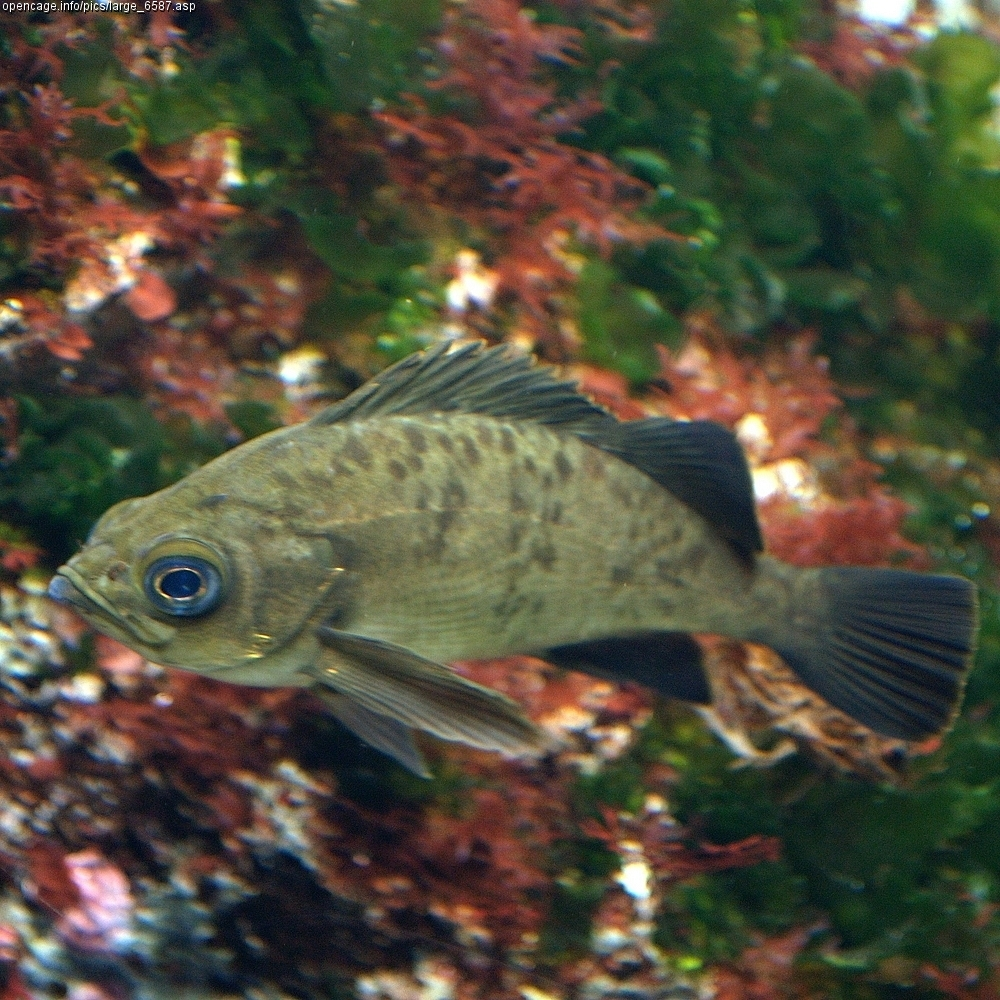

Scientific classification
- Kingdom: Animalia
- Phylum: Chordata
- Class: Actinopterygii
- Order: Perciformes
- Family: Scorpaenidae
- Genus: Sebastes
- Species: S. inermis

Binomial name
- Sebastes inermis G. Cuvier, 1829

Synonyms
- Sebastodes inermis (Cuvier, 1829)

= Sebastes inermis =

Species of fish

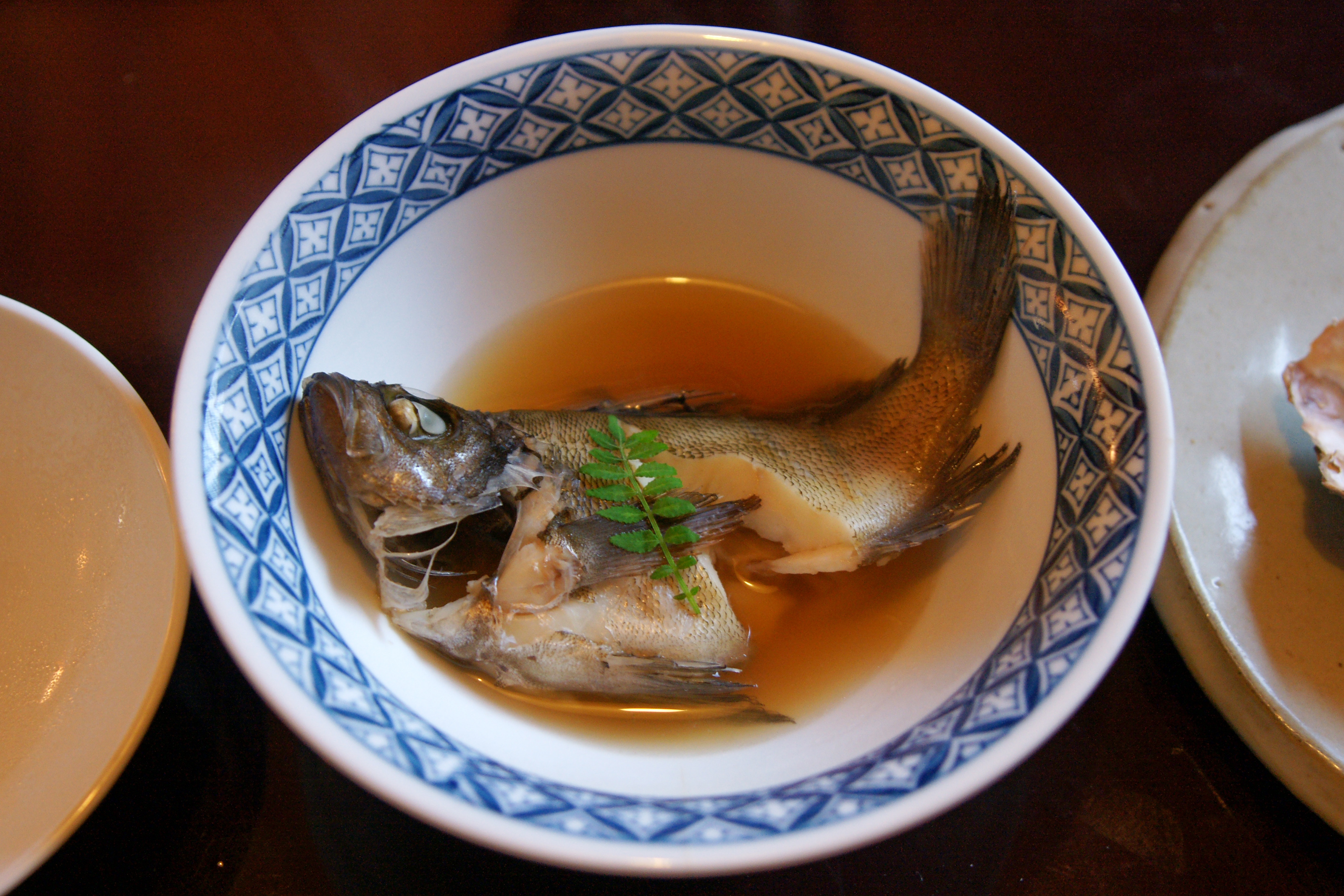
メバルの煮付け（Japanese cuisine）

Sebastes inermis, the Japanese red seaperch or dark-banded rockfish, is a species of marine ray-finned fish belonging to the subfamily Sebastinae, the rockfishes, part of the family Scorpaenidae. It is found in the northwestern Pacific Ocean. This species is known as mebaru (メバル/鮴) in Japan and as bollak (볼락) in Korea.

== Taxonomy ==
Sebastes inermis was first formally described in 1829 by the French zoologist Georges Cuvier with the type locality given as Japan. Together with S. ventricosus and S. cheni these three taxa form a species complex and have been treated as a single species in the past. Some authorities place this species complex in the subgenus Mebarus. The specific name inermis means "unarmed", a reference to the relatively small spines on the head.

== Description ==
Sebastes inermis has sharp lachrymal spines with the rest of the spines on the head are rather weak. The caudal fin is not strongly emarginate. It has a dark red or pale brown body on the back and flanks. The pectoral fins reach beyond the level of the anus when held down., The pectoral fins have 15 rays while the anal fin has 7 rays. This species grows to a total length of 35.9 cm (14.1 in), and the heaviest recorded specimen weighed 800 g (1.8 lb).

== Distribution and habitat ==
Sebastes inermis it occurs from southern Hokkaido southward to Kyushu, Japan, and the southern part of the Korean Peninsula. It is a demersal fish with pelagic juveniles which live among floating mats of seaweeds.

== Biology ==
Sebastes inermis feeds on zooplankton. Males are territorial, establishing territories which range in area from 12 to 70 m^{2} (130 to 750 sq ft). The male initiates courtship when a female approaches their territory and perform a lateral display with rushing and turning movements being recorded frequently as part of the courtship. The courtship behaviour lasts for around 30 minutes before copulation. It climaxes with the pair ascending into the water column, 1.5 to 2.0 m (4 ft 11 in to 6 ft 7 in) above the seabed, the male suddenly coils around the body of the female to copulate.

== Human usage ==
Sebastes inermis is one of the most important target species for fisheries in Japan and is also grown in aquaculture to supply market demand.

== Sea perch fishing ==
Sea perch are very popular seawater game fish highly prized especially by fishermen, because they generally put up a good fight when caught with a hook and line. As sea perch are predatory fish, lure fishing (which use replica baits called lures to imitate live prey) is the predominant form of sport fishing involving sea perch, although traditional bait fishing techniques using floats and/or sinkers (particularly with moving live baits such as baitfish, krill or shrimp) are also successful.

It is recommended that when fishing for sea perch, that the fisher(s) should use line in the 1–5 lb test for sea perch. It is also recommended to use a hook size 8-5 for sea perch of all kind. Sea perch, tend to like ragworms, minnows, or cut bait.
