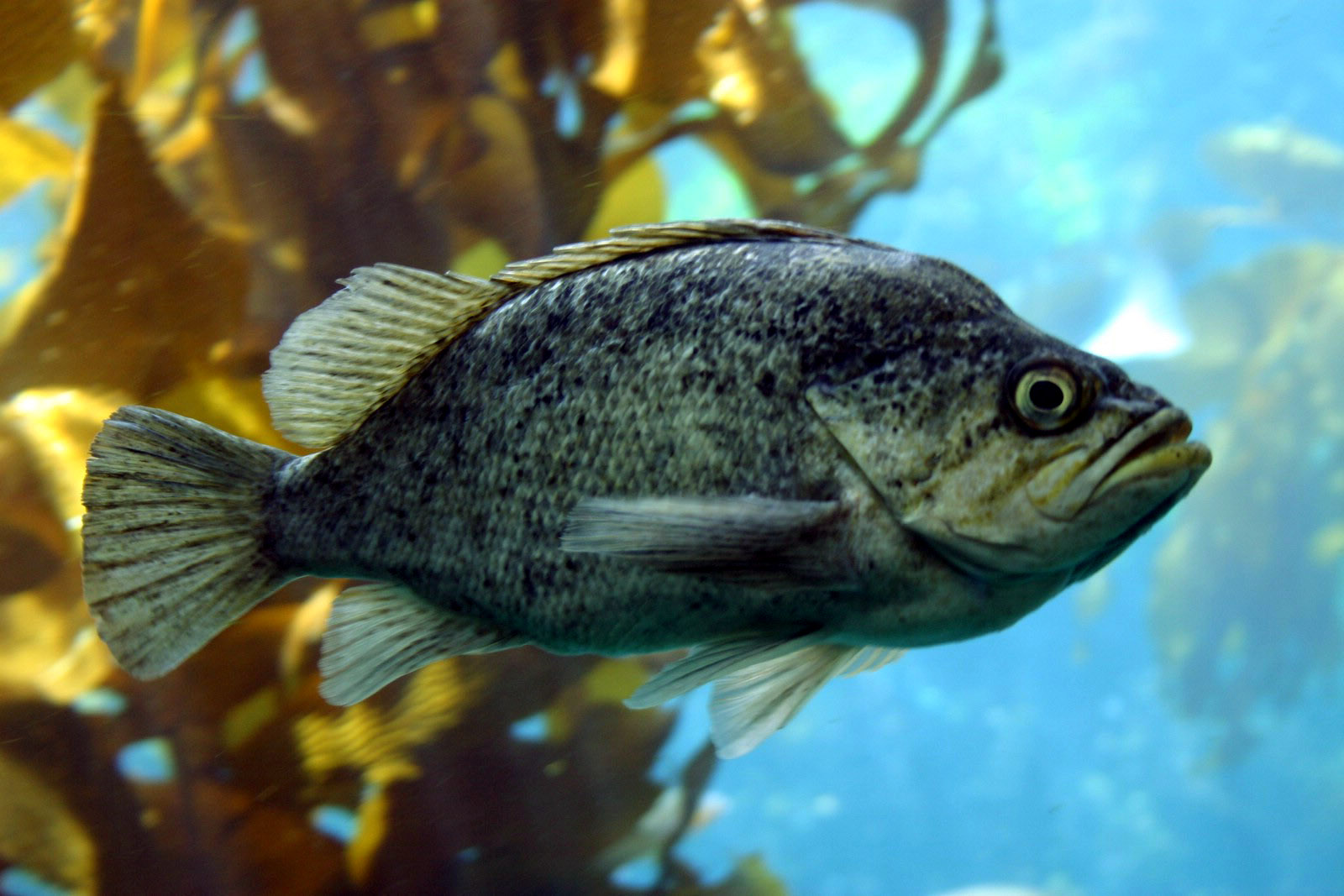

Scientific classification
- Kingdom: Animalia
- Phylum: Chordata
- Class: Actinopterygii
- Order: Perciformes
- Family: Scorpaenidae
- Genus: Sebastes
- Species: S. atrovirens

Binomial name
- Sebastes atrovirens (Jordan and Gilbert, 1880)

Synonyms
- Sebastichthys atrovirens Jordan & Gilbert, 1880

= Sebastes atrovirens =

Species of fish

Sebastes atrovirens, the kelp rockfish, is a species of marine ray-finned fish belonging to the subfamily Sebastinae, the rockfishes, part of the family Scorpaenidae. It is native to the Pacific Ocean along the coast of California in the United States and Baja California in Mexico.

== Taxonomy ==
Sebastes atrvirens was first formally described as Sebastichthys atrovirens in 1880 by the American ichthyologists David Starr Jordan and Charles Henry Gilbert with the type locality given as Point Conception in San Diego, California. Some authorities place this species in the subgenus Mebarus. The specific name atrovirens means "black and green" thought to be an allusion to the olive green color with black marbling.

== Description ==
This species reaches about 42 centimeters in length. Its life span is up to 15 to 20 or even 25 years. Individuals may be tan, brown, green, reddish, blackish, whitish, or brown-mottled. The snout has an "up-turned" look. This species was recently moved from the Sebastes subgenus Mebarus to Pteropodus, which also includes brown, gopher, copper, black-and-yellow, calico, quillback, China, and grass rockfishes. Like some other rockfish, this species can produce an auditory signal in the form of a low-frequency pulsing noise.

== Distribution ==
This marine fish is distributed from Sonoma County, California, south to central Baja California. The climate is subtropical. It lives in coastal waters up to 42 meters deep, but usually not more than about 12 meters. Its habitat includes kelp beds and rocky seabeds. It commonly associates with several other species of rockfish in this habitat, but it is more closely associated with the kelp than the others. During the day it often rests on the kelp blades, sometimes upside down. The main kelp species is Macrocystis pyrifera, the giant kelp. Other brown algaes in the habitat can include Pterygophora californica, Cystoseira osmundacea, and species of Desmarestia. It is also known from artificial habitat types, such as oil rigs.

== Diet ==
The diet of the fish is rich in crustaceans such as the isopod Pentidotea resecata, as well as cephalopods and gastropods, and it is known to prey on juvenile blue rockfish (Sebastes mystinus) and plainfin midshipmen (Porichthys notatus). It does most of its hunting at night. In captivity, larvae have been reared on diets of Brachionus plicatilis, a rotifer, with supplements of copepods and veligers as they develop. The nauplius of the brine shrimp Artemia salina becomes the main food later. Captive adults can be maintained on chopped squid and live prey such as the night smelt (Spirinchus starksi).

== Spawning ==
Spawning starts in February in the northern part of its range, and in March farther south. A female will mate with multiple males and can store sperm, yielding broods of eggs that have multiple fathers. Like other fish of its genus, this species is viviparous. The gravid female expels her whole brood at once, only during the night. The larva is between 4 and 5 millimeters long at birth. It still has a small bit of yolk or oil on its belly which is absorbed within a few days. It quickly develops its head spines. It has some pigmentation at birth in the form of melanophores and xanthophores and develops more as it grows.

== Role as prey ==
This rockfish is an important prey item for many other animals. The larva is consumed by siphonophores and chaetognaths. The juvenile is food for other fish, such as lingcod, cabezon, and salmon, as well as many birds, pinnipeds, and porpoises. The adult is prey for sharks, dolphins, and seals. Additionally, this species is taken in spearfishing and angling.
