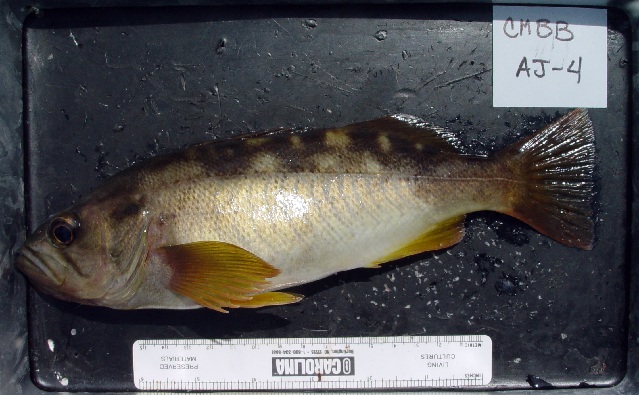

Scientific classification
- Kingdom: Animalia
- Phylum: Chordata
- Class: Actinopterygii
- Division: Teleostei
- Order: Perciformes
- Family: Scorpaenidae
- Genus: Sebastes
- Species: S. serranoides

Binomial name
- Sebastes serranoides (C. H. Eigenmann & R. S. Eigenmann, 1890)

Synonyms
- Sebastodes serranoides Eigenmann & Eigenmann, 1890

= Sebastes serranoides =

Species of fish

Sebastes serranoides, the olive rockfish, is a species of marine ray-finned fish belonging to the subfamily Sebastinae, the rockfishes, part of the family Scorpaenidae. It is found in the Eastern Pacific.

== Taxonomy ==
Sebastes serranoides was first formally described in 1890 as Sebastodes serranoides by the American ichthyologists Carl H. Eigenmann and Rosa Smith Eigenmann with the type locality given as Cortes Bank off California. Some authorities classify this species in the subgenus Sebastomus. The specific name serranoides means having the form of Serranus, actually Paralabrax clathratus, which fishermen did not distinguish this species from.

== Description ==
Sebastes serranoides has a slender, elongate, streamlined body which has a depth that is just under one-third of its standard length with a medium-sized head that has no spines and a small terminal mouth. They have a truncate caudal fin. The dorsal fin has 12 or 13 spines and 15 to 17 soft rays while the anal fin has 3 spines and 8-10 soft rays. This species attains a maximum total length of 61 cm (24 in) and a maximum published weight of 1.6 kg (3.5 lb). The color is dark greenish-brown or brown on the upper body fading to lighter greenish-brown, brown or gray on the lower body. There are greenish or pale colored blotches immediately underneath the dorsal fin base and the fins are dark olive with some yellow.

== Distribution and habitat ==
Sebastes serranoides is found from southern Oregon to Guerrero Negro in Baja California. It is found at depths down to 146 m (479 ft) but is more typically encountered at depths less than 30 m (98 ft). The larval stage of the olive rockfish, lie that of other rockfishes, is planktonic settling within a year in and around kelp beds, oil platforms, Phyllospadix beds and other structures in shallow water. As they mature they move to live over high-relief reefs, as well as around the midwaters of oil platforms. In shallow area this species can be found in all of the water column within and in the vicinity of kelp beds, and they have been recorded resting on the bottom too.

== Biology ==
Sebastes serranoides males usually become sexually mature at slightly smaller sizes and at a marginally older age than is typical for females. The males reach sexual maturity at 27 to 31 cm (11 to 12 in) when they are around 4 years old, while for females it is at 28 to 31 cm (11 to 12 in). This is an ovoviviparous species with internal fertilisation. Females may bear between 30,000 and 490,000 eggs, depending on size. They mate in the autumn and the females extrude larvae annually from December up to March, with a peak in January. The planktonic larval stage lasts 3 to 6 months and they settle from April to September when they are around 3.0 to 4 cm (1.2 to 1.6 in) in length. They are frequently found in mixed aggregations with the blue rockfish (S. mystinus). The smaller fishes feed on zooplankton while larger individuals prey on squid, octopus and other fishes.

== Fisheries ==
Sebastes serranoides is of minor importance in commercial fisheries which take it with gillnets and hook and line. It is an important species for recreational fishers off the coast of Southern California where the stock had declined by roughly 80% over the past four decades.
