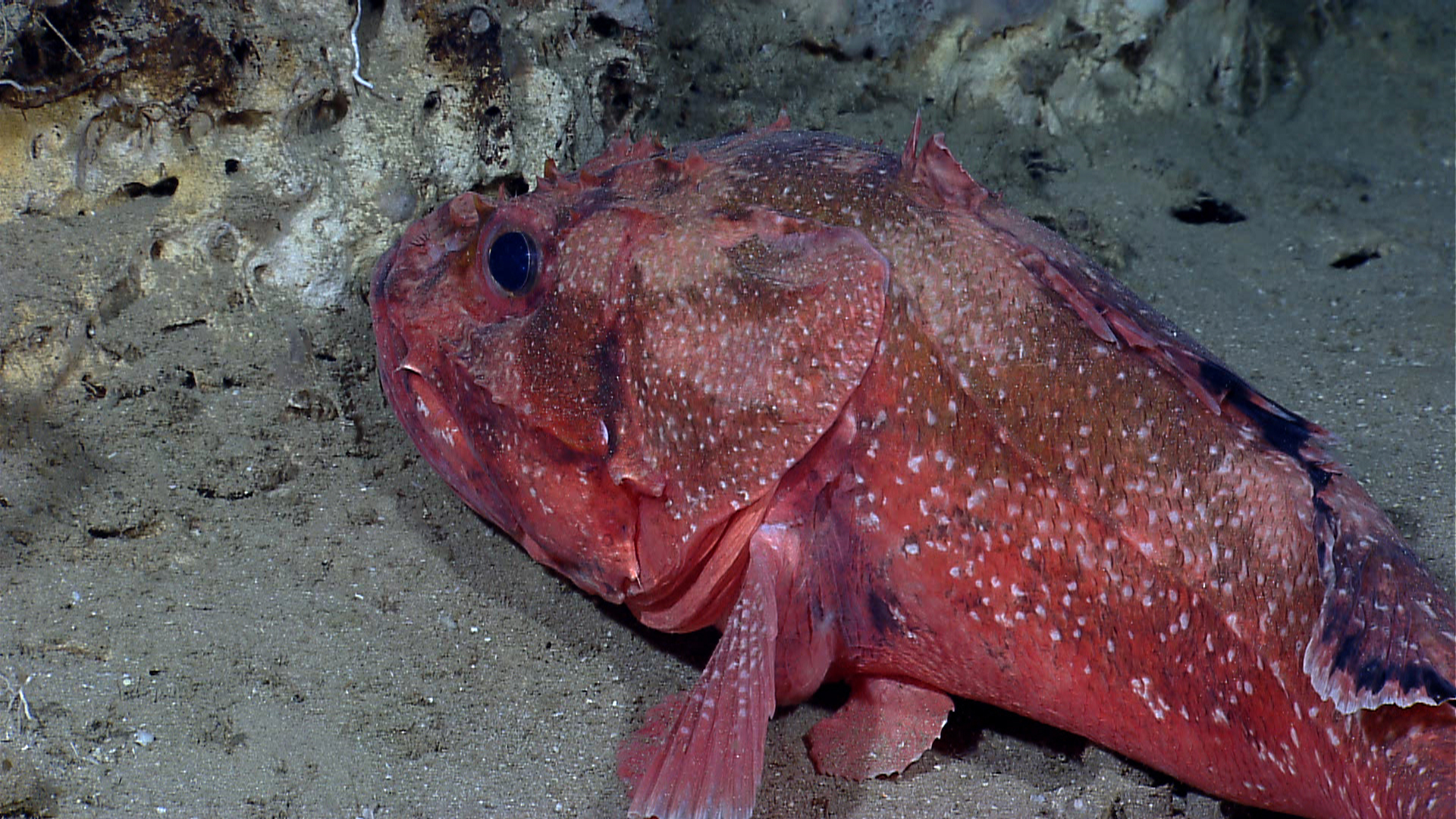

Conservation status
- Least Concern (IUCN 3.1)

Scientific classification
- Kingdom: Animalia
- Phylum: Chordata
- Class: Actinopterygii
- Order: Perciformes
- Family: Scorpaenidae
- Genus: Trachyscorpia
- Species: T. cristulata

Binomial name
- Trachyscorpia cristulata (Goode & Bean, 1896)

Synonyms
- Scorpaena cristulata Goode & Bean, 1896; Trachyscorpia cristulata cristulata (Goode & Bean, 1896)

= Atlantic thornyhead =

Species of fish

The Atlantic thornyhead (Trachyscorpia cristulata) is a species of marine ray-finned fish belonging to the subfamily Sebastinae, the rockfishes, part of the family Scorpaenidae. It is found in the western Atlantic Ocean and the Caribbean Sea.

== Taxonomy ==
The Atlantic thornyhead was first formally described in 1896 as Scorpaena cristulata by the American ichthyologists George Brown Goode and Tarleton Hoffman Bean with the type locality given as off Georgia. When the Lithuanian-born American ichthyologist Isaac Ginsburg raised the genus Trachyscorpia he designated S. cristulata as its type species. Some authorities consider the spiny scorpionfish (T. echinata) to either be a subspecies or to be synonymous with T. cristulata. The specific name cristulata is a diminutive of cristata meaning "tufted" or "crested", Goode and Bean did not explain this allusion but it may refer to the filaments behind nearly all the head spines.

== Description ==
The Atlantic thornyhead has a large head which takes up almost half of its standard length with a short snout. The head bones are strong and are armed with well developed spines. There is no occipital pit and the eyes are moderately large. The sides of the roof of the mouth have teeth. The bone to the front and below the eye has 2 spines, the first points outwards and backwards and the second points backwards. There is a horizontal ridge beneath and to the rear off the eye which has numerous small spines. There are 4-5 spines on the preoperculum with the first being the longest and has a small supplementary spine, The dorsal fin has 12 spines and 8-10 soft rays while the anal fin has 3 spines and 5 soft rays. The pectoral fin is bilobed with the longest of its 21-24 rays at the top, rays 2 to 10-12 are branched and the lower rays become fleshy in larger fish. It has rough scales. The lateral line extends to the base of the caudal fin. This species grows to a maximum standard length of 50 cm (20 in). The overall colour is red with brown and white mottling on the head and body and pale blotches on the crown and along the spine.

== Distribution and habitat ==
The Atlantic thorny head is found in the Western Atlantic Ocean. It is found along the eastern seaboard of North America from Massachusetts south to Florida and into the Gulf of Mexico. It is a demersal fish which is found on hard substrates, as well as soft bottoms close to reefs and rocks. It is found at depths of 130 to 1,100 m (430 to 3,610 ft).

== Biology ==
The Atlantic thornyhead is likely to be similar in biology o the closely related spiny scorpionfish. It has venom bearing spines.
