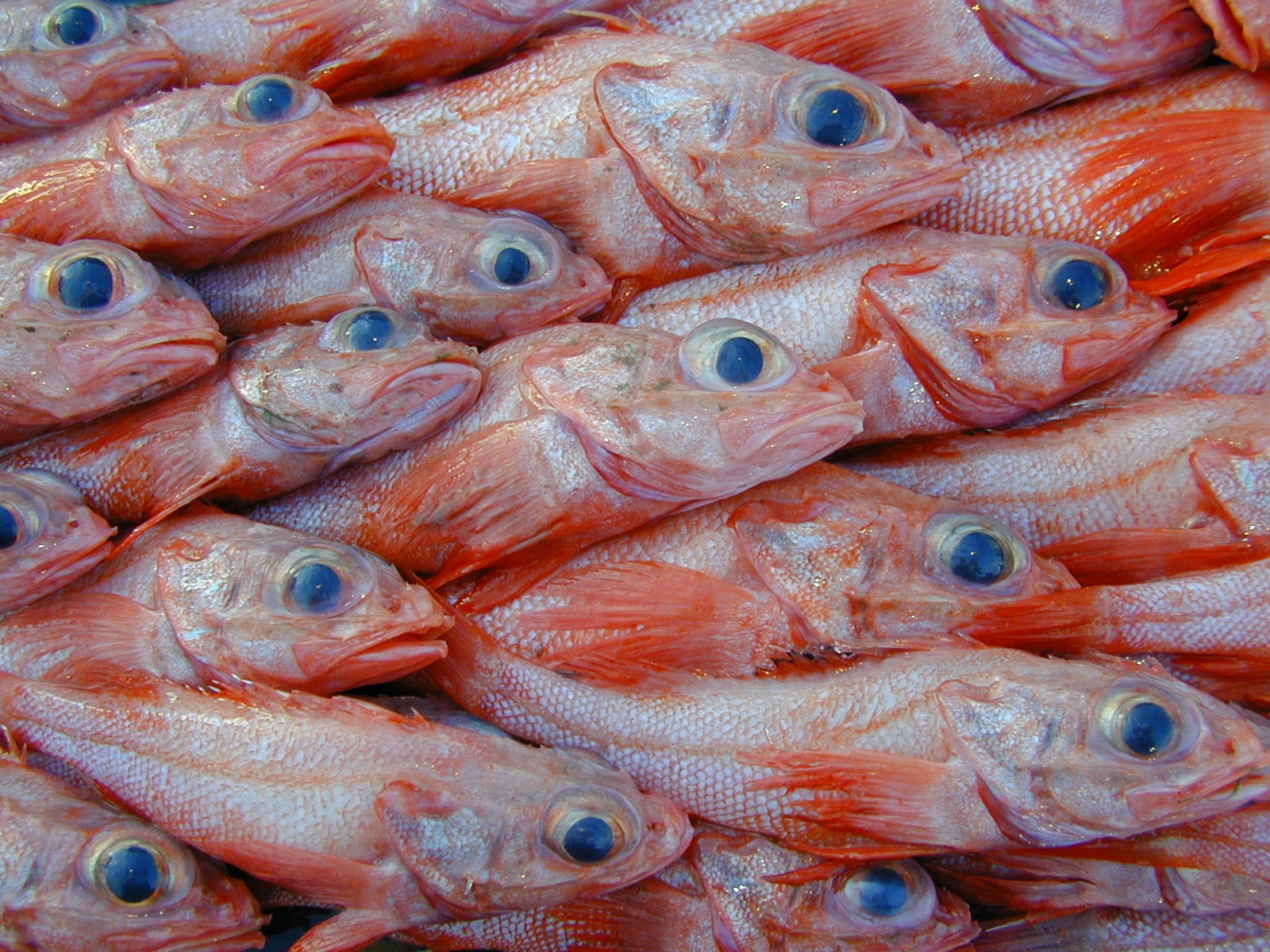
- Longspine thornyhead (S. altivelis)

Scientific classification
- Kingdom: Animalia
- Phylum: Chordata
- Class: Actinopterygii
- Division: Teleostei
- Order: Perciformes
- Suborder: Scorpaenoidei
- Family: Scorpaenidae
- Subfamily: Sebastolobinae
- Genus: Sebastolobus; T. N. Gill, 1881

Type species
- Sebastes macrochir Günther, 1877

= Sebastolobus =

Genus of fishes

Sebastolobus, the thornyheads, is a genus of marine ray-finned fish belonging to the subfamily Sebastinae, the rockfishes, part of the family Scorpaenidae. These fishes are native to the northern and eastern Pacific Ocean. They are generally found in deep waters.

== Taxonomy ==
Sebastolobus was first described as a genus by the American ichthyologist Theodore Gill in 1881 with Sebastes macrochir, a species described, with its type locality given as Japan, by the German-born British ichthyologist and herpetologist Albert Gunther in 1877. It is the type genus of the tribe Sebastolobini, one of two in the Sebastinae, a subfamily of the family Scorpaenidae. The generic name is a compound of Sebastes, the original genus of the type species, and lobus, "lobed", a reference to the lower rays of the pectoral fins being widened into tongue-shaped lobes.

== Species ==
There are currently three recognized species in this genus:

| Image | Scientific name | Common name | Distribution |
|---|---|---|---|
| | Sebastolobus alascanus T. H. Bean, 1890 | Shortspine thornyhead | Pacific Ocean and is known from Canada, Alaska and the Russian Federation. |
| | Sebastolobus altivelis C. H. Gilbert, 1896 | Longspine thornyhead | Pacific Ocean and is found from the Aleutian Islands, Alaska to southern Baja California, Mexico. |
| | Sebastolobus macrochir (Günther, 1877) | Broadbanded thornyhead | Sagami Bay, Japan to the southern Kuril Islands and off Sakhalin, Russia |

== Characteristics ==
Sebastolobus thornyheads have moderately compressed bodies with relatively large head armed with 8 pairs of robust spines along its top. The eyes are large and there is a horizontal suborbital ridge which is armed with another 8-10 strong spines. They have a large number of conical teeth on the jaws with teeth on the roof of the mouth too. The single dorsal fin is incised to the rear of the spiny part. There are 15 to 17 robust and venom bearing spines in the dorsal fin, followed by between 8 and 11 soft rays. The anal fin has 3 spines and between 4 and 6 soft rays. The caudal fin is straight edged. These species have maximum lengths which vary from 39 cm (15 in) total length in S. altevelis up to a standard length 80 cm (31 in) in S. alascanus.

== Distribution and habitat ==
Sebastolobus thornyheads are found in the northern Pacific Ocean in both the eastern and western parts with vagrants extending as far south as Costa Rica. They are demersal fishes which are found over soft substrates.

== Biology ==
Sebastolobus thornyheads are oviparous, unlike the rockfishes in the genus Sebastes and the females extrude gelatinous egg masses.
