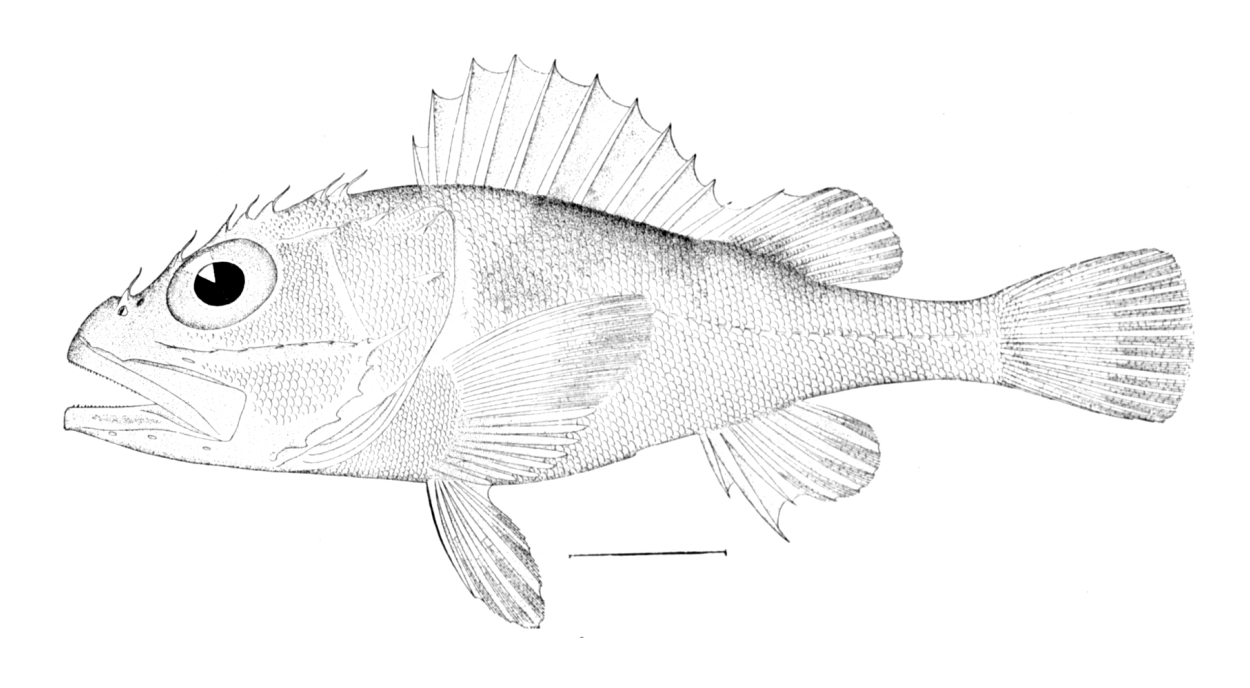
- Atlantic thornyhead (T. cristulata)

Scientific classification
- Kingdom: Animalia
- Phylum: Chordata
- Class: Actinopterygii
- Order: Perciformes
- Family: Scorpaenidae
- Subfamily: Sebastolobinae
- Genus: Trachyscorpia; Ginsburg, 1953

Type species
- * Scorpaena cristulata Goode & T. H. Bean, 1896

= Trachyscorpia =

Genus of fishes

Trachyscorpia is a genus of marine ray-finned fish belonging to the subfamily Sebastinae, the rockfishes, part of the family Scorpaenidae. The species in this genus are found in the Atlantic, Indian and Pacific oceans.

== Taxonomy ==
Trachyscorpia was first described as a genus by the Lithuanian-born American ichthyologist Isaac Ginsburg in 1953 with Scorpaena cristulata, a species described by the American ichthyologists George Brown Goode and Tarleton Hoffman Bean in 1896 from off Georgia, designated as its type species. The generic name, Trachyscorpia is a compound of trachys, meaning "coarse" or "rough", and scorpia, which means "scorpion", the first part is a reference to the ctenoid scales of the type species and the second is derived from Scorpaena the original genus of T. cristulata.

== Species ==
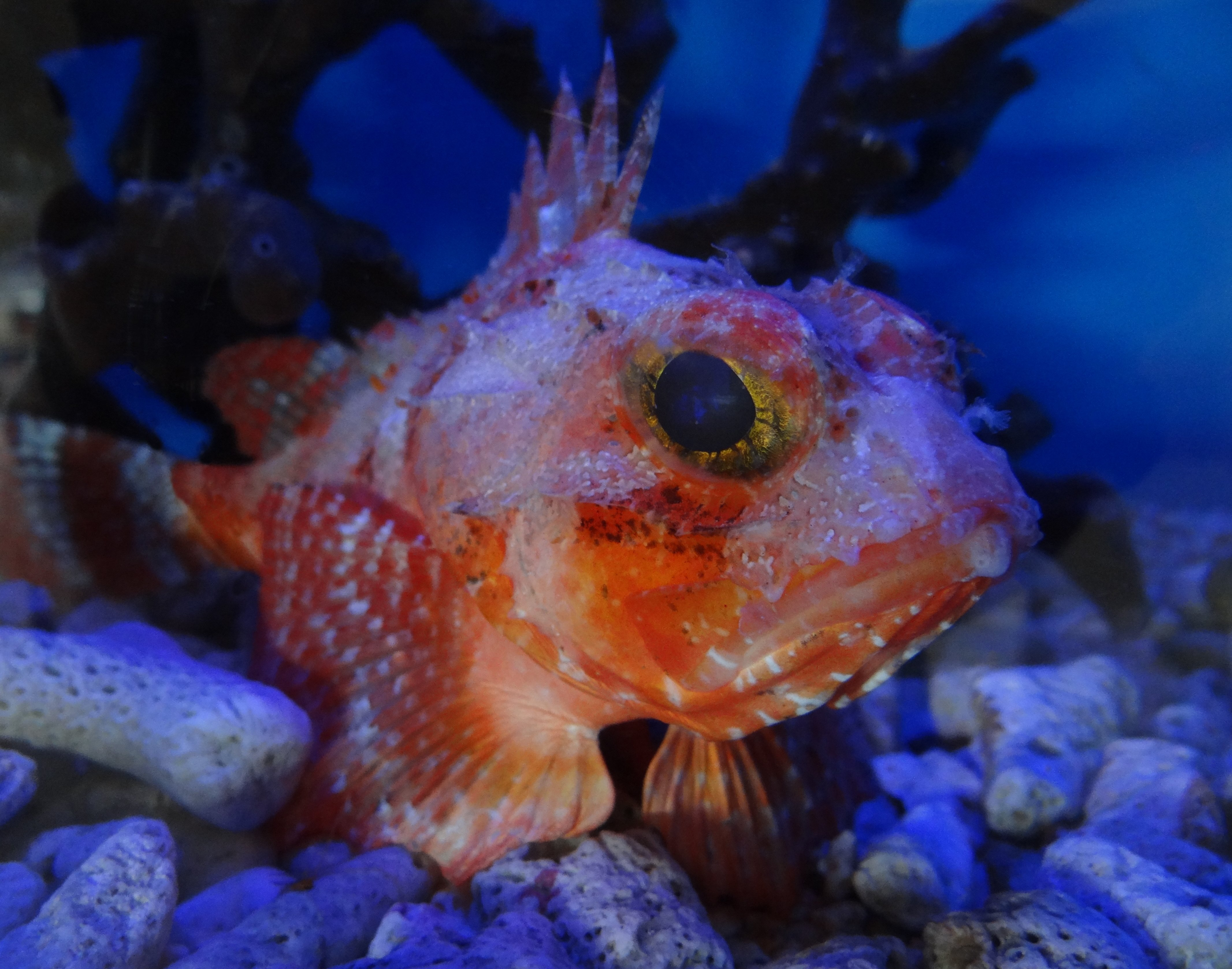
A Trachyscorpia specimen yet to be classified more exactly. Kept at the Sea Aquarium in Curaçao.

There are currently seven recognised species in this genus:

- Trachyscorpia carnomagula Motomura, Last & Yearsley, 2007 (deepsea scorpionfish)
- Trachyscorpia cristulata (Goode & T. H. Bean, 1896) (Atlantic thornyhead)
- Trachyscorpia echinata (Koehler (fr), 1896) (spiny scorpionfish)
- Trachyscorpia eschmeyeri Whitley, 1970 (Cape rockfish)
- Trachyscorpia longipedicula Motomura, Last & Yearsley, 2007 (stylish scorpionfish)
- Trachyscorpia osheri McCosker, 2008
- Trachyscorpia verai Béarez & Motomura, 2009 (Ecuadorian deep-sea scorpionfish)

== Characteristics ==
Trachyscorpia is characterised by having a large head, which is almost half the length of the body, with a short snout and robust bones with strong spines. They do not have a pit located to the rear of their eyes. The eyes are quite large and have a horizontal ridge running beneath them which is armed with spines. The preoperculum has 4–5 spines, with the 1st spine being longer than the others and this spine has a main spine and a supplementary spine. There are 13 spines and between 8 and 10 soft rays in the dorsal fin while the anal fin has 3 spines and 5 soft rays, The pectoral fin is not wedge shaped and is bilobed with longest rays at top, there are 21–24 pectoral fin rays and the upper rays are branched. In larger fish the lower pectoral fin rays are fleshy, Thera are rough scales on cheek, in the intraorbital space and behind the eyes while the lateral line is complete, it reaches the base of the caudal fin, and has tubed scales. These species have maximum lengths which vary from 14.7 cm (5.8 in) standard length in T. osheri up to a total length 56.9 cm (22.4 in) in T. echinata.

== Distribution and habitat ==
Trachyscorpia thornyheads are found in the Atlantic, Pacific and Indian Oceans. They are demersal fish which are usually found at depths greater than 100 m (330 ft).

== Biology ==
Trachyscorpia thornyheads are thought to be oviparous and, like other taxa in the tribe Sebastolobini, the females likely extrude internally fertilised eggs in gelatinous masses which float. They have venomous spines. They are predatory fishes feeding on benthic invertebrates and on other fishes.
