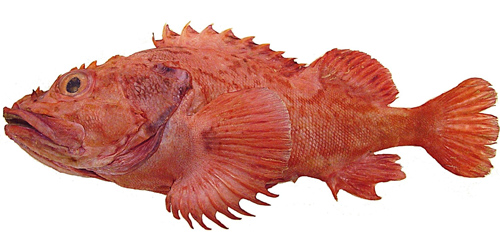

Scientific classification
- Kingdom: Animalia
- Phylum: Chordata
- Class: Actinopterygii
- Order: Perciformes
- Family: Scorpaenidae
- Subfamily: Sebastolobinae
- Genus: Adelosebastes; Eschmeyer, T. Abe & Nakano, 1979
- Species: A. latens

Binomial name
- Adelosebastes latens Eschmeyer, T. Abe & Nakano, 1979

= Adelosebastes =

Genus of fishes

Adelosebastes is a monotypic genus of marine ray-finned fish belonging to the subfamily Sebastinae, the rockfishes, part of the family Scorpaenidae. The only species in this genus is Adelosebastes latens, the Aleutian scorpionfish. It is found in the northern Pacific Ocean.

== Taxonomy ==
Adelosebastes was formally described as a genus in 1979 by the ichthyologists William N. Eschmeyer, Tokiharu Abe and Soji Nakano when they described its only species Adelosebastes latens. A. latens was described from types collected at the Emperor Seamounts and the Aleutian Islands. The generic name Adelosebastes is a compound of adelos which means "unseen" in Greek, the allusion was not explained, it likely refers to this species occurring in the "poorly explored" Emperor Seamount Chain at depths of 900 to 1,000 m (3,000 to 3,300 ft); and Sebastes, the type genus of the subfamily Sebastinae. The specific name, latens, means secret in Latin, again the authors did not explain this allusion but it is probably in line with their use of adelos in the genus name.

== Description ==
Adelosebastes latens has 12 spines and 13 soft rays in its dorsal fin while the anal fin has 3 spines and 5 soft rays, the last ray being a double ray. The suborbital ridge has weak or no spines present and the pectoral fin may have two lobes. The overall colour in living specimens is bright crimson red, although this fades to yellowish in preserved specimens. In some specimens there may be dark markings on the nape and the back. There is normally a black mark on the rear of the gill cover and some black spots on the membranes of the dorsal and pectoral fins. There may also be three bands of indistinct black spots on the back. The maximum recorded standard length is 33.5 cm (13.2 in). There are robust spines on the head which can be up to 1 cm (0.39 in) in length.

== Distribution and habitat ==
Adelosebastes latens is found in the northern Pacific Ocean and has been recorded from the length of the Emperor Sea Mount Chain, the most westerly and northern part of the Hawaiian–Emperor seamount chain which extends north from the western end of the Northwestern Hawaiian Islands to the Kuril–Kamchatka Trench. They are also found in the Aleutian Islands. This is a bathydemersal fish which may be found at depths between 900 and 1,200 m (3,000 and 3,900 ft).
