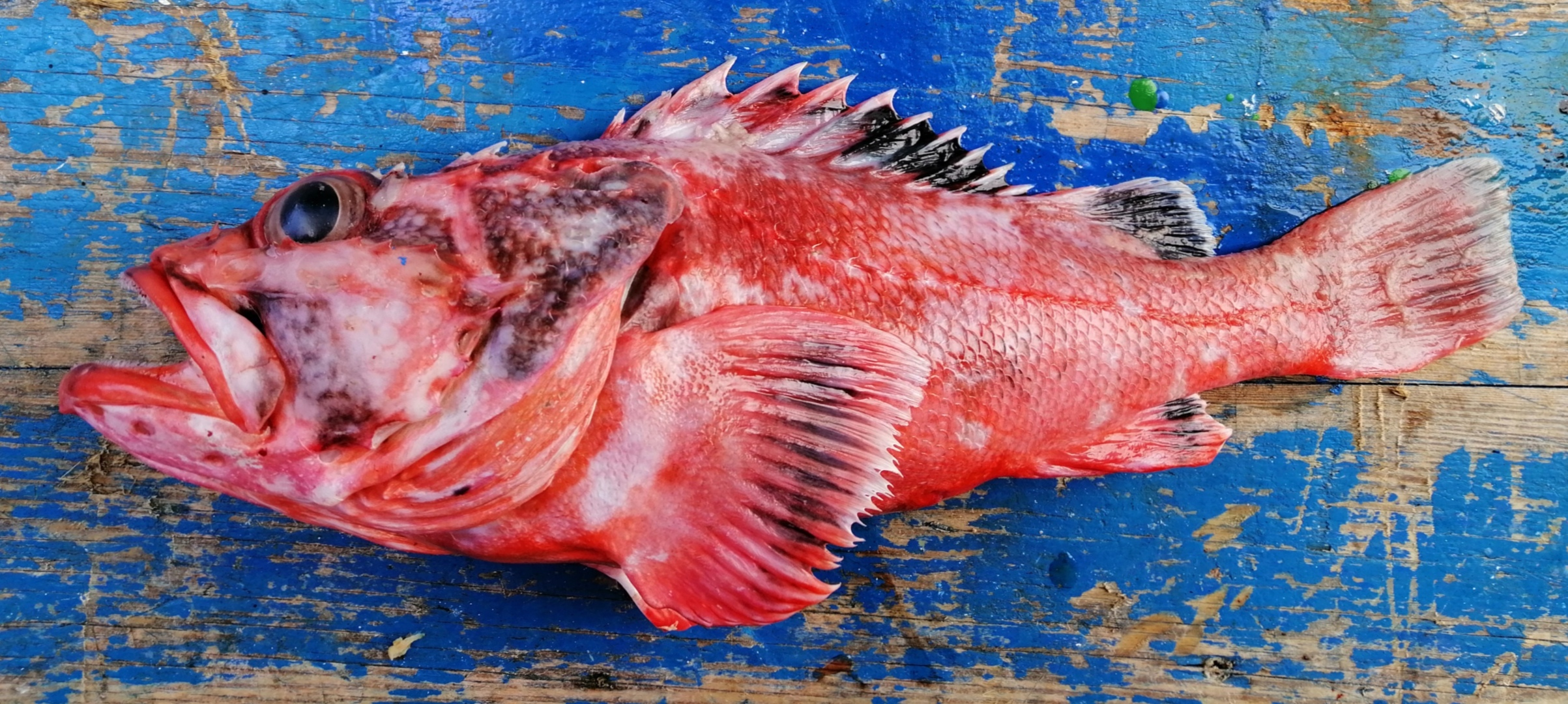

Conservation status
- Data Deficient (IUCN 3.1)

Scientific classification
- Kingdom: Animalia
- Phylum: Chordata
- Class: Actinopterygii
- Order: Perciformes
- Family: Scorpaenidae
- Genus: Trachyscorpia
- Species: T. echinata

Binomial name
- Trachyscorpia echinata Koehler, 1896

Synonyms
- Scorpaena echinata Koehler, 1896; Trachyscorpia cristulata echinata Koehler, 1896

= Spiny scorpionfish =

Species of fish

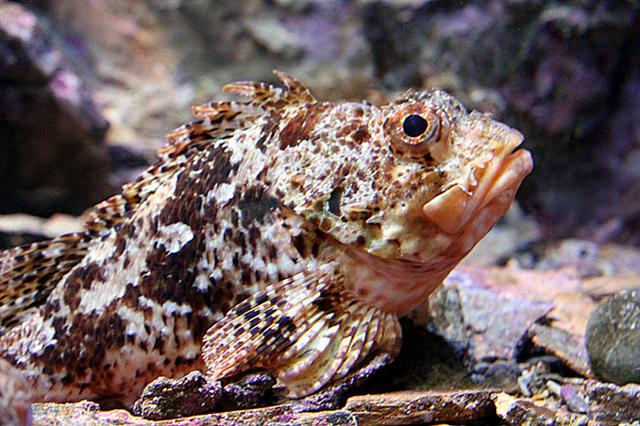
Spiny scorpionfish

The spiny scorpionfish (Trachyscorpia echinata) is a species of marine ray-finned fish belonging to the subfamily Sebastinae, the rockfishes, part of the family Scorpaenidae. It is found in the eastern Atlantic Ocean and the Mediterranean.

== Taxonomy ==
The spiny scorpionfish was first formally described as Scorpaena echinata in 1896 by the French zoologist Jean Baptiste François René Koehler with the type locality given as the Bay of Biscay in France. Many authorities regard this taxon as a subspecies of the Atlantic thornyhead (Trachyscorpia cristulata), while others regard it as a synonym of that taxon. This taxon is also placed by some authorities in the subgenus Trachyscorpia. The specific name echinata means "prickly", an allusion Koehler did not explain, but it is likely to be a reference to its spiny ctenoid scales.

== Description ==
The spiny scorpionfish has a large head and orbit and a maximum length of 50 cm (1 ft 8 in), typically 30 cm (1 ft 0 in). It is reddish with a dusky pigment on back and sides; the dorsal fin is black in males and brown in females.

== Distribution and habitat ==
The spiny scorpionfish lives in the northeast Atlantic Ocean and Mediterranean Sea. It is benthic, living at muddy sand bottoms at depths of 200–2,500 m (660–8,200 ft).

== Diet ==
The spiny scorpionfish eats other fish, including eels.

== Reproduction ==
The spiny scorpionfish is oviparous.
