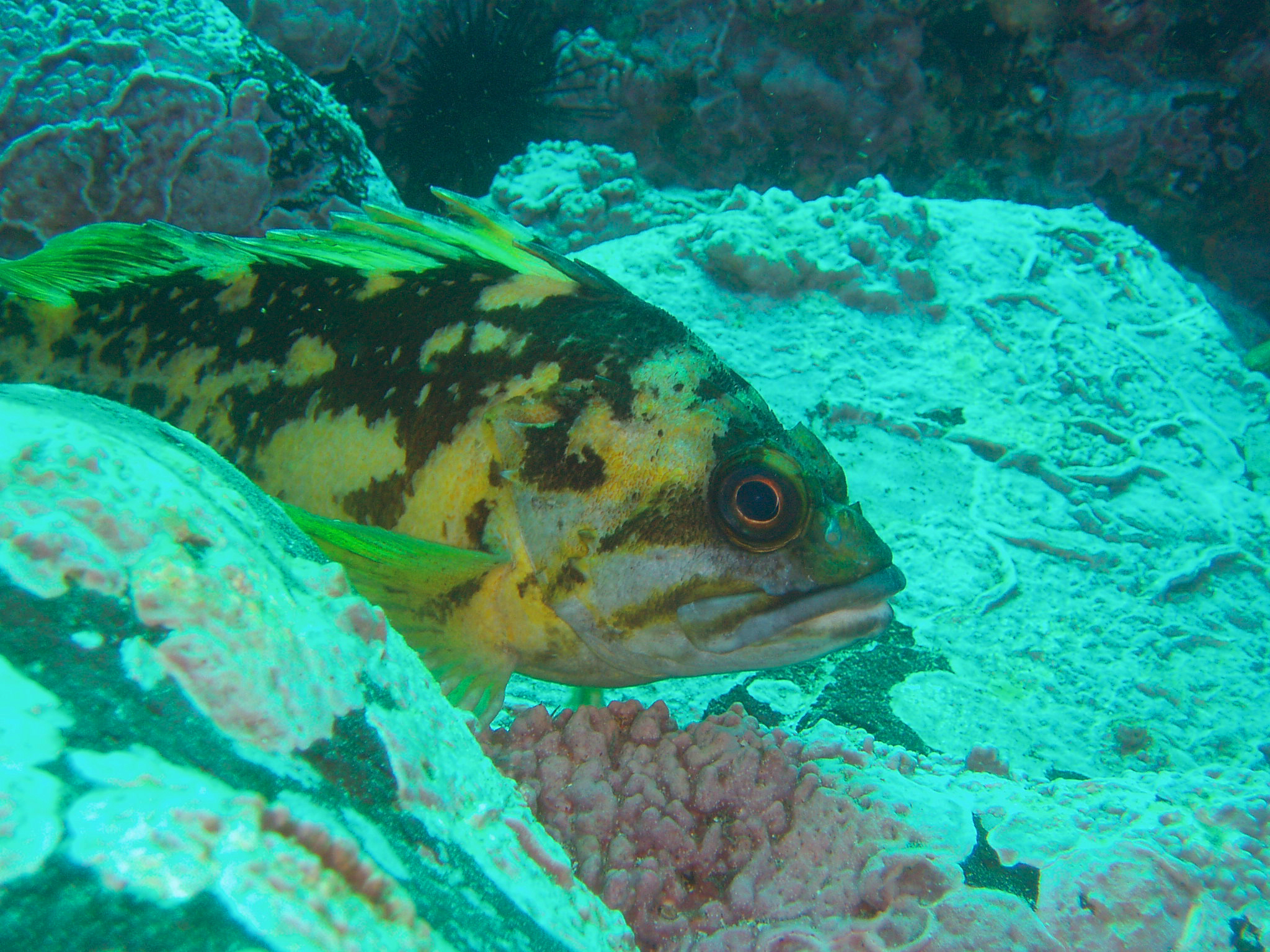
- Black-and-yellow rockfish in the Channel Islands National Marine Sanctuary.

Scientific classification
- Kingdom: Animalia
- Phylum: Chordata
- Class: Actinopterygii
- Order: Perciformes
- Family: Scorpaenidae
- Genus: Sebastes
- Species: S. chrysomelas

Binomial name
- Sebastes chrysomelas (D. S. Jordan & C. H. Gilbert, 1881)

Synonyms
- Sebastichthys chrysomelas Jordan & Gilbert, 1881; Sebastodes chrysomelas (Jordan & Gilbert, 1881)

= Sebastes chrysomelas =

Species of fish

Sebastes chrysomelas, commonly known as the black-and-yellow rockfish, is a marine fish species of the family Sebastidae. It is found in rocky areas in the Pacific off California and Baja California. Although it is similar in appearance to the China rockfish, the black-and-yellow rockfish lacks the China's long yellow streak. The China rockfish has a continuous yellow band while the black-and-yellow rockfish only has scattered patches of yellow across its body.

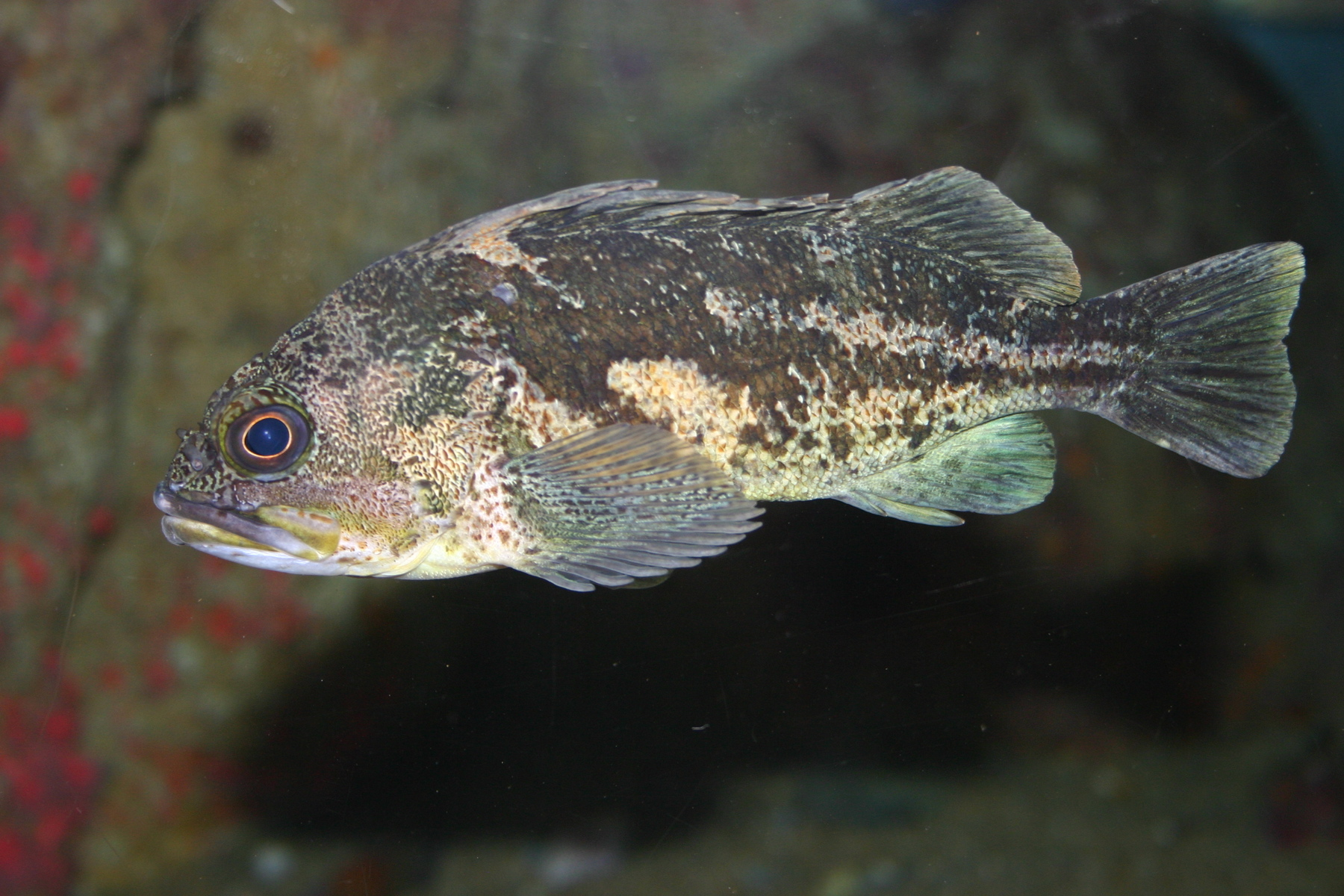
The black-and-yellow rockfish has speckles that are similar to the China rockfish, but lacks the long yellow streak starting at the foredorsal fin curves.

== Taxonomy ==
Sebastes chrysomelas was first formally described as Sebastichthys chlorostictus in 1881 by the American ichthyologists David Starr Jordan and Charles Henry Gilbert with the type locality given as Monterey, California. Some authorities place this species in the subgenus Pteropodus. The specific name chrysomelas means "gold and black" a reference to the black-and-yellow color of this species.

== Description ==
Sebastes chrysomelas' body is mainly black or brown and consists of yellow to orange spots on its back with a pale underbelly. The body is typically squat and compact, and covered with spines. Around the eyes, there are faint dark stripes and its lower lip is a dark grey color. The yellow spots on the back are the main distinguishing factor between Sebastes chrysomelas and other species of rockfish. Its head consists of 5 pairs of large spines. Their anal fins have 3 spines and 6–7 soft rays, and the pectoral fins have 17–18 rays with a flesh-like appearance. The anal and dorsal fins are mildly venomous which tend to cause a painful wound. The average size of the fish is 39 cm.

== Behavior ==
Sebastes chrysomelas is a solitary and sedentary fish, and become most active during twilight hours. They are highly territorial once establishing a home and they seldom move more than 2km away from their home. They tend to be aggressive towards other species, as they exclude the similar looking Sebastes carnatus from shallower waters.

== Reproduction ==
Sebastes chrysomelas is a viviparous fish, giving birth to live young. Females tend to mature between 3 and 6 years, whereas, males mature between 3 and 4 years. Mating begins in the latter parts of January to February with spawning occurring between February and July. Females can be seen carrying fertilized eggs for 1–2 months, typically starting in October, and then releasing them as pelagic larvae. The first young settle in kelp beds in June. The estimated life expectancy is up to thirty years.

== Distribution ==
Sebastes chrysomelas is found in waters around the coast of northern California to central Baja California, Mexico. These waters typically range between 11.0 and 21.4 degrees Celsius. It inhabits intertidal zones and shallow waters up to 37m in-depth. The black-and-yellow rockfish has also been found to inhabit holes and cracks in rocky zones. They can be commonly found around rocky water areas and reefs or near kelp beds.

== Prey and predation ==
Sebastes chrysomelas is a carnivorous animal that mainly consumes crustaceans, mollusks and various fishes. It is a nocturnal predator, typically ambushing its prey between dusk and dawn. The main predator of adult Sebastes chrysomelas are sharks, dolphins, and seals, while juveniles are hunted by birds, porpoises, fishes, lingcod, Ophiodon elongatus, cabezon, Scorpaenichthys marmoratus, and salmon.

== Genetics ==
A potential PCR-RFLP genetic sex marker developed for gopher rockfish. In the original study, the marker was able to successfully distinguish male and female black-and-yellow rockfish, but it was unsuccessful in a subsequent study using the same method. Chromosome 19 has been identified as a putative sex chromosome for the species.

== Fisheries ==
Sebastes chrysomelas is considered to be a highly palatable food fish. They have been an important commercial species which commanded fairly high prices throughout their range. This species is still an important component of fisheries in central and northern California. They are also a frequent quarry for recreational anglers both from shore and from boats.
