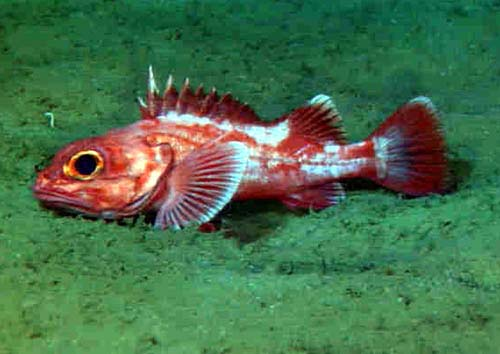
- Longspine thornyhead observed by a remotely operated underwater vehicle near Astoria Canyon

Scientific classification
- Kingdom: Animalia
- Phylum: Chordata
- Class: Actinopterygii
- Order: Perciformes
- Family: Scorpaenidae
- Genus: Sebastolobus
- Species: S. altivelis

Binomial name
- Sebastolobus altivelis Gilbert, 1896

Synonyms
- Sebastodes altivelis Gilbert, 1896

= Sebastolobus altivelis =

Species of fish

Sebastolobus altivelis, the longspine thornyhead, is a species of marine ray-finned fish belonging to the subfamily Sebastinae, the rockfishes, part of the family Scorpaenidae. It is found in deep waters of the northeastern Pacific Ocean. Longspine thornyhead are similar in appearance to shortspine thornyhead though they don't grow as large and are typically found in deeper water.

== Taxonomy ==
Sebastolobus altivelis was first formally described in 1896 by the American ichthyologist Charles Henry Gilbert with the type locality given as being south of the Alaskan Peninsula at Albatross station 3338 at a depth 625 fathoms. The specific name altivelis is a compound of altus which means "high" and velum meaning"sail", an allusion to the taller dorsal fin spines than S. macrochir.

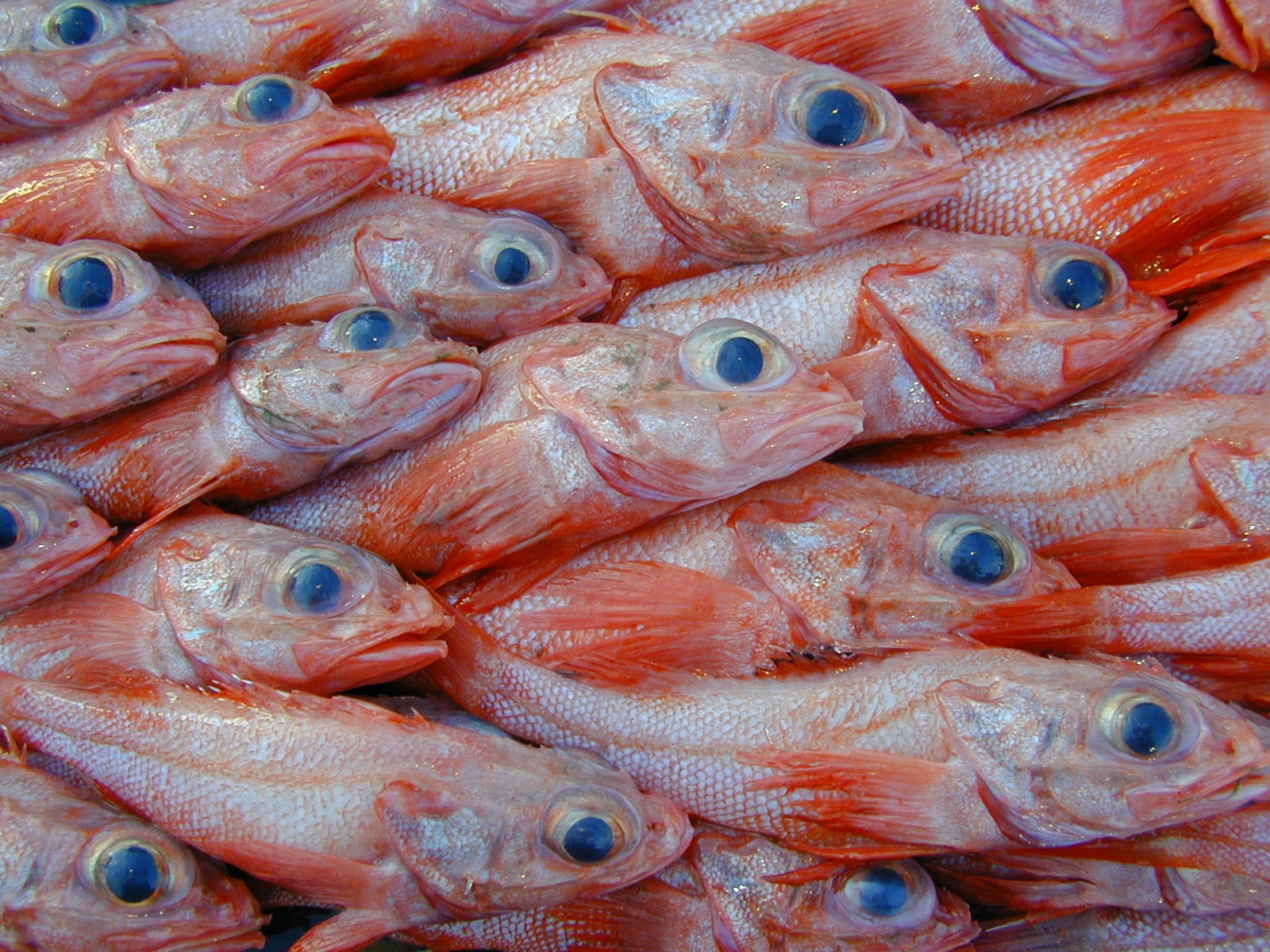

== Description ==
Sebastolobus altivelis has a moderately compressed, elongate body with a relatively large, pointed head, The spiny head is armed with strong nasal, preocular, supraocular, postocular, tympanic, parietal and nuchal spines but there are no spines on the coronal. There are spines on a ridge on the sub-orbital bone. It has large eyes which are closely set and sit on the top of the head with a depression between them. There is a single dorsal fin, clearly incised at the rear of the spiny part. There are 15–17, typically 15, strong, venomous spines and 8-9 soft rays. The third dorsal fin spine is much higher than the fourth. The anal fin has 3 spines, the second spine being the longest, and 4-6 soft rays 4–6. The caudal fin has a square rear edge. The overall color is red to orange-red with white blotches on their back, cheeks, and the spiny part of the dorsal fin. They have dark colored gill chambers and black blotches on their flanks. This species attains a maximum total length of 39 cm (15 in).

== Distribution and habitat ==
Sebastolobus altivelisis native to the cold waters of the northeastern Pacific Ocean and is found from the Aleutian Islands, Alaska to southern Baja California, Mexico. Its depth range is between 201 and 1,757 m (659 and 5,764 ft) but it primarily occurs deeper than 600 metres (2,000 ft). It is typically found over soft substrates biu may be found at the edges of reefs on harder substrates.

== Biology ==
Sebastolobus altivelis is a solitary species which typically lies motionless on the seabed for long periods of time. This species preys on other fish and invertebrates such as amphipods and shrimp. It is a long lived species which may live for up to 45 years. Fertilization is internal and the females release the fertilized eggs in a floating, gelatinous mass in the Spring. The eggs hatch at the surface and the larvae and juveniles remain pelagic for up to 6 months. As the juveniles mature they gradually move into deeper waters although they usually remain at depths of around 600 m (2,000 ft), in the mesopelagic zone. After a year the young adults they settle. Juveniles feed on krill.

== Status ==
Both shortspine and longspine thornyhead have been harvested in commercial fisheries with the period of peak catches occurring in the 1980s and 1990s.

Separate stock assessments for longspine thornyhead in the waters off Alaska and the West Coast of the United States have estimated the stock as healthy (above the management limits) with overfishing not occurring.

In the Canadian waters off the coast of British Columbia, a COSEWIC report declared the species a "special concern" based on the slow life history and declining trend in abundance, though no estimates of abundance or stock status were made.
