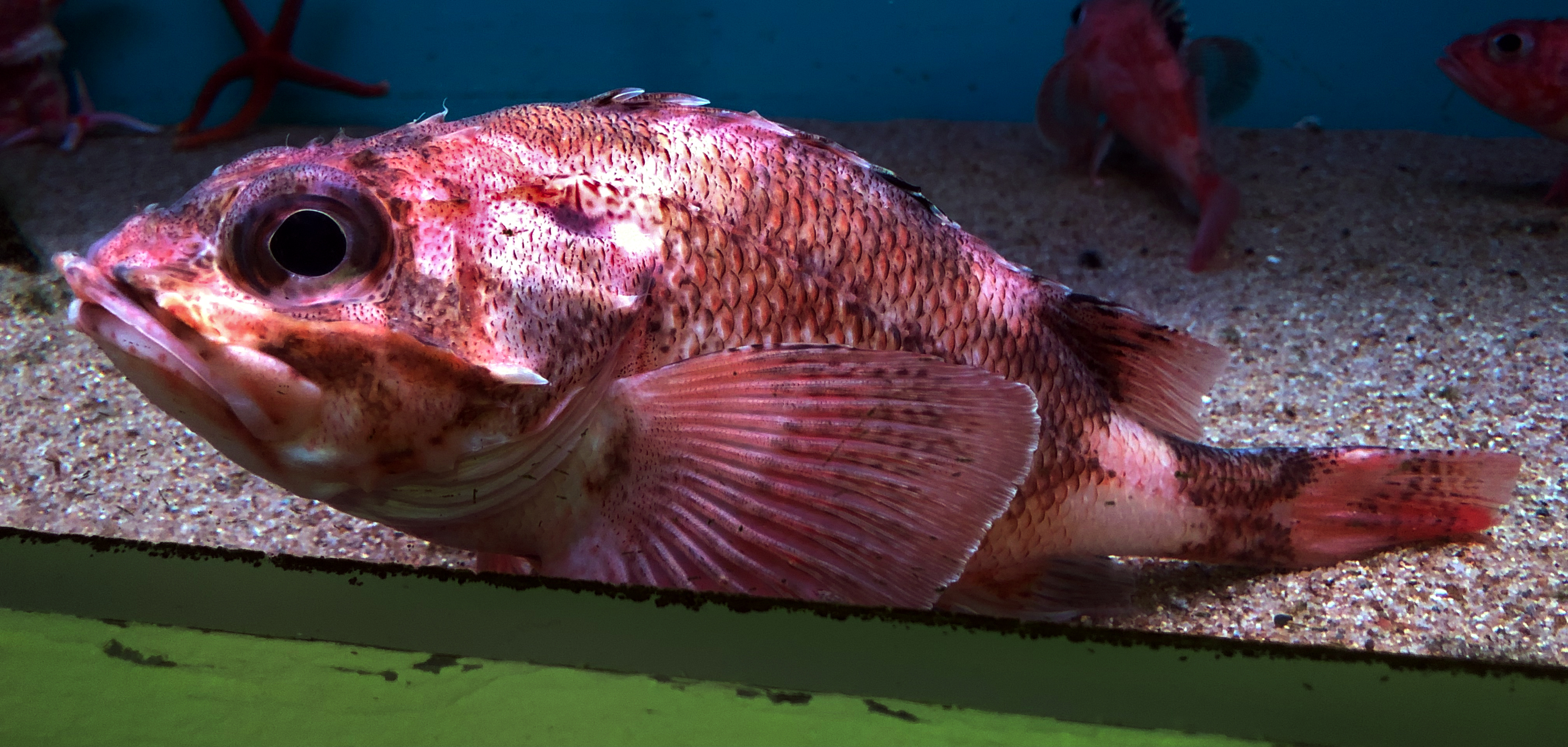

Scientific classification
- Kingdom: Animalia
- Phylum: Chordata
- Class: Actinopterygii
- Order: Perciformes
- Family: Scorpaenidae
- Genus: Sebastolobus
- Species: S. macrochir

Binomial name
- Sebastolobus macrochir (Günther, 1877)

Synonyms
- Sebastes macrochir Günther, 1877; Sebastodes macrochir (Günther, 1877)

= Sebastolobus macrochir =

Species of fish

Sebastolobus macrochir, the broadbanded thornyhead or broadfin thorny head, is a species of marine ray-finned fish belonging to the subfamily Sebastinae, the rockfishes, part of the family Scorpaenidae. It is found in deep waters of the northwestern Pacific Ocean.

== Taxonomy ==
Sebastolobus macrochir was first formally described in 1877 as Sebastes macrochir by the German born British ichthyologist and herpetologist Albert Günther with the type locality given as the Inland Sea of Japan. When the American ichthyologist Theodore Gill described the genus Sebastolobus Sebastes macrochir was the type species by monotypy, two other species have since been added. The specific name acrochir is a compound of macro which means "long" or "large" and cheirus meaning "hand", an allusion to the broad pectoral fin with its upper 5 or 6 tays elongatedrays.

== Description ==
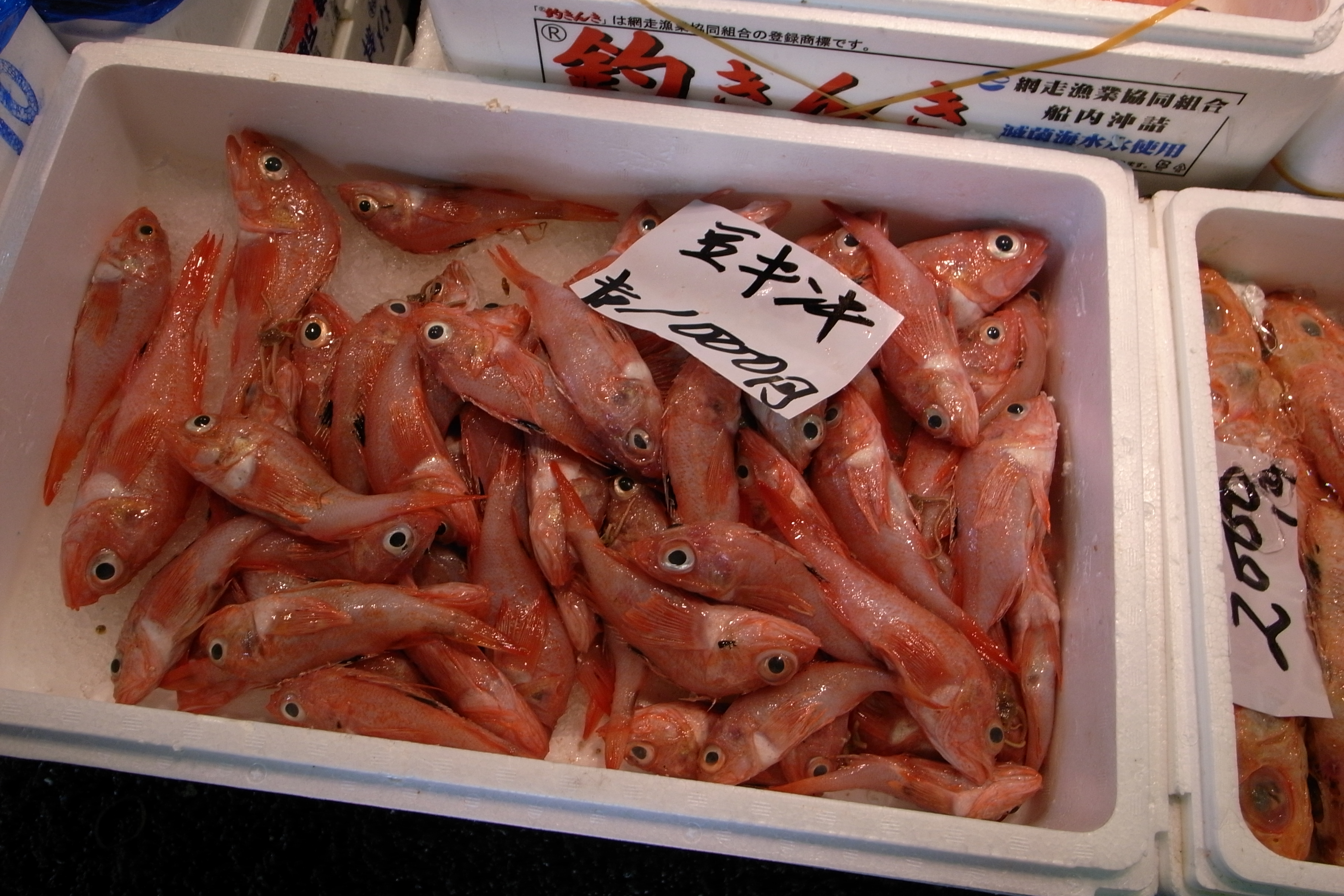
Young thorny head being sold in Japan

Sebastolobus macrochir has 15-16 spines and 8-10 soft rays in its dorsal fin and 3 spines and 5 soft rays in its anal fin. There is an incision in the pectoral fin with the rays below the incision being widened to form a lobe. The spines on the head are strong and erect. The mouth is large, the; maxillary reaches to the centre of the eye. This species attains a maximum standard length of 44 cm (17 in), although around 26 cm (10 in) is a more typical standard length, and a maximum published weight of 1.2 kg (2.6 lb). The overall colour is yellowish-Red and there is a black blotch on the dorsal fin.

== Distribution and habitat ==
Sebastolobus macrochir is found between 31°N and 51°N in the northwestern Pacific Ocean. Its range extends from Sagami Bay in Japan north to the Kuril Islands and Sakhalin in Russia. This is demersal species which is found at depths of 257 to 1,537 m (843 to 5,043 ft).

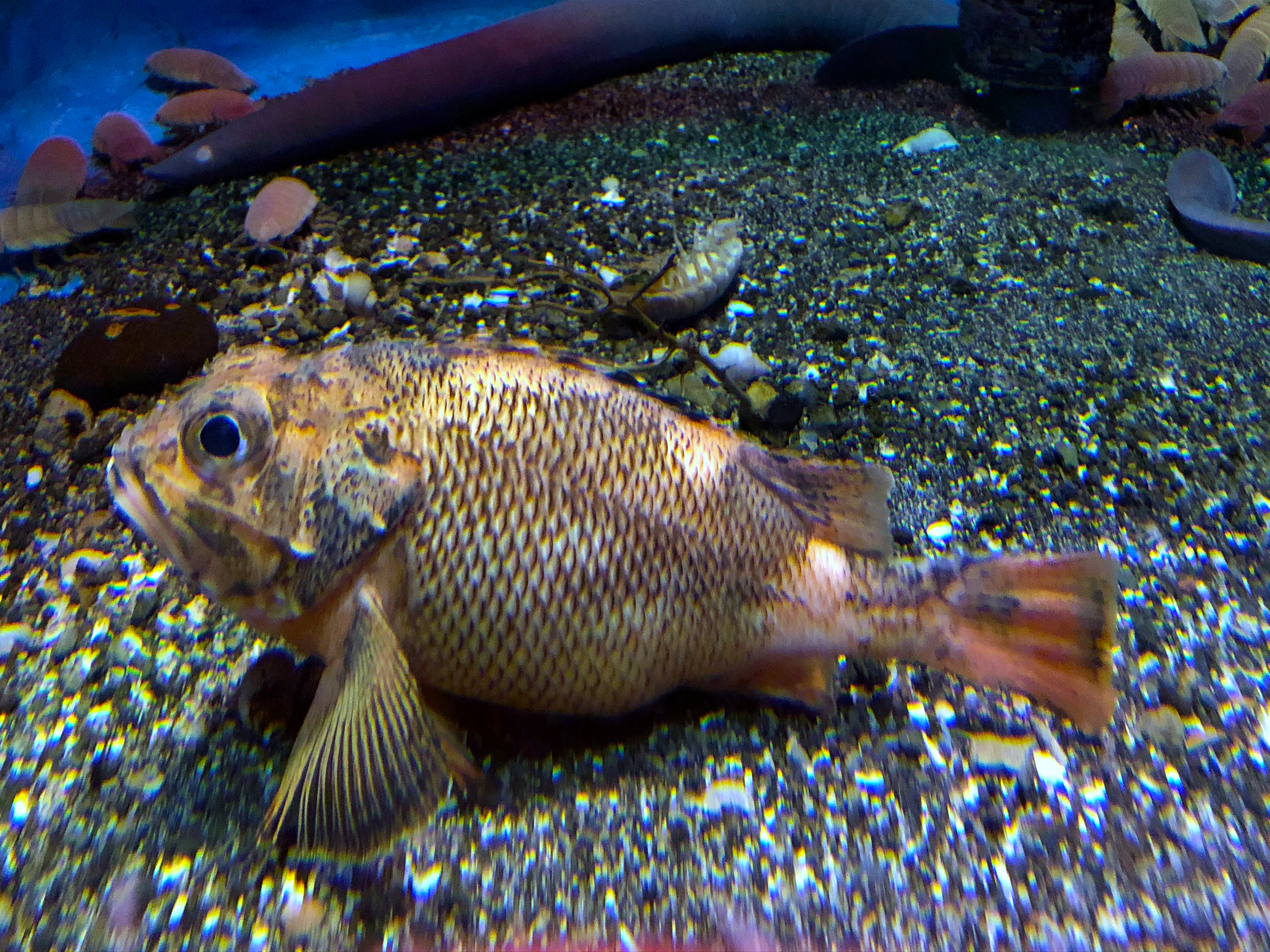
Sebastolobus macrochir shizuoka

== Biology ==
Sebastolobus macrochir is found in areas where there is steep bottom relief near areas of very deep water which results in turbulent currents rising vertically from deeper water, bringing food items to the fish. It is an oviparous fish, the eggs are fertilised internally and the females extrude gelatinous masses containing the eggs. The egg masses float. The smaller fish prey on smaller crustaceans such as gammarids and cumaceans changing to decapods and ophiuroids, mainly Cphiura leptoctenia, in larger fishes.
