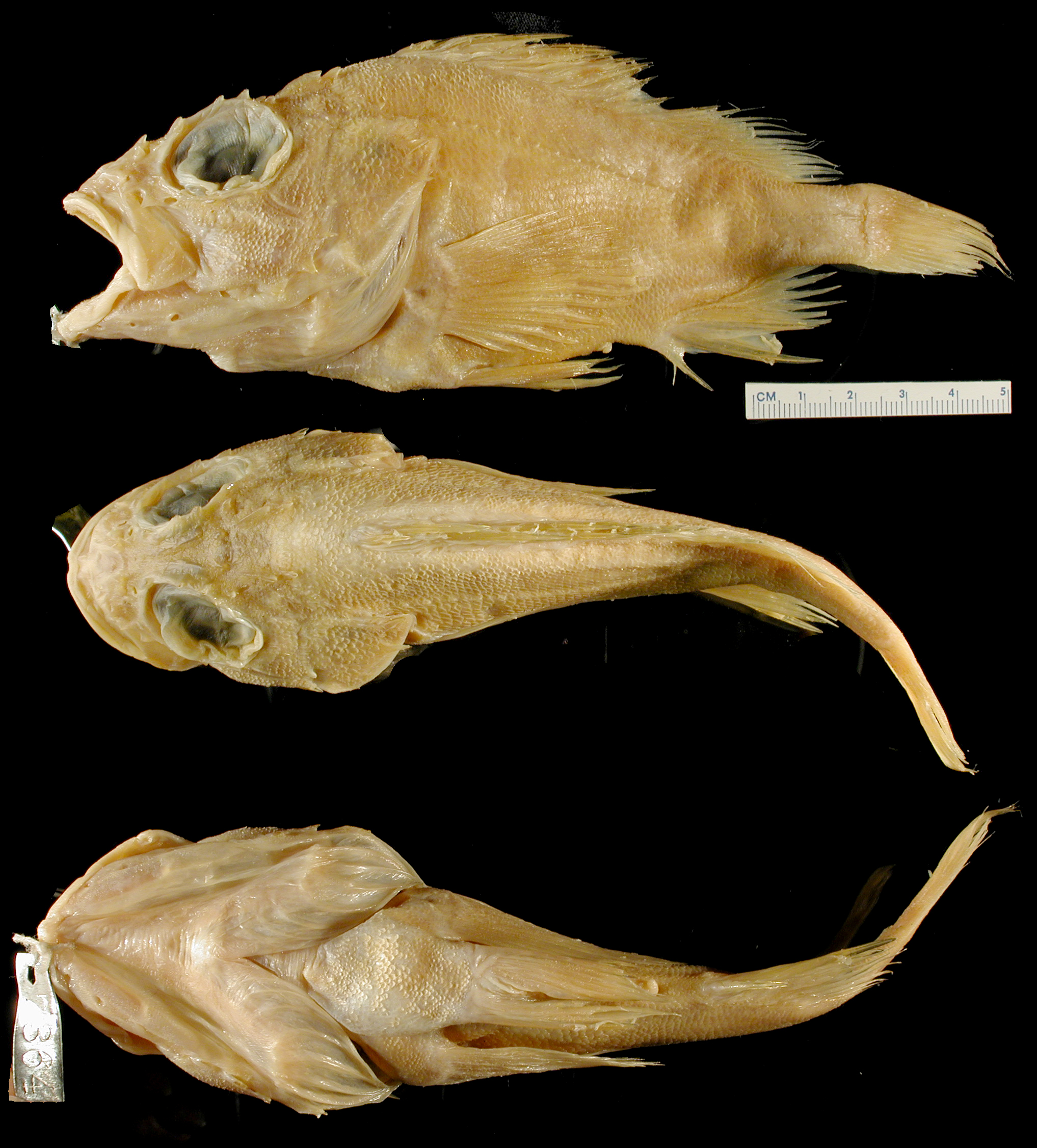
- Hozukius emblemarius

Scientific classification
- Kingdom: Animalia
- Phylum: Chordata
- Class: Actinopterygii
- Order: Perciformes
- Suborder: Scorpaenoidei
- Family: Scorpaenidae
- Subfamily: Sebastinae
- Genus: Hozukius; Matsubara, 1934

Type species
- Helicolenus emblemarius Jordan & Starks 1904

= Hozukius =

Genus of fishes

Hozukius is a genus of marine ray-finned fishes belonging to the subfamily Sebastinae within the family Scorpaenidae. They are native to the northwestern Pacific Ocean.

== Taxonomy ==
Hozukius was described as a monotypic genus in 1934 by the Japanese ichthyologist Kiyomatsu Matsubara with Helicolenus emblemarius which had been described by David Starr Jordan and Edith Chapin Starks in 1904 with its type locality given as Okinose, near Misaki in Japan its only species. A second species, H. guyotensis, was described in 1975. The genus name is probably derived from hozuki, the Japanese name for the flowering plant Physalis alkekengi, which has bright red or orange fruit and is a traditional component of Japanese Buddhist culture, its bright-red colour being similar to that of H. emblemarius.

== Species ==
There are currently two recognised species in this genus:

- Hozukius emblemarius (D. S. Jordan & Starks, 1904)
- Hozukius guyotensis Barsukov & Fedorov, 1975

== Characeristics ==
Hozukius rockfishes have maximum standard lengths of 45 to 59 cm (18 to 23 in). They have 12 spines in the dorsal fin and 26 vertebrae, they have a swim bladder and the intraorbital bone is firmly connected to the upper margin of the preoperculum. They also have a deep body, three spines on lower margin of the eye and a truncate caudal fin.

== Distribution and habitat ==
Hozukius fishes are only found in the northwestern Pacific Ocean. H. emblemarius around Japan and H. guyotensis on the Emperor Seamounts. They are bathydemersal and demersal fish which are found as deep as 1,000 m (3,300 ft). There is one record of H. emblemaris from Korean waters of the Sea of Japan. Both species are described as being rare.
