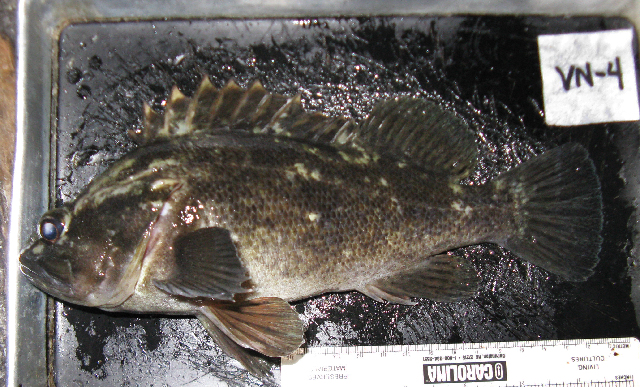

Scientific classification
- Kingdom: Animalia
- Phylum: Chordata
- Class: Actinopterygii
- Order: Perciformes
- Family: Scorpaenidae
- Genus: Sebastes
- Species: S. rastrelliger

Binomial name
- Sebastes rastrelliger (Jordan & Gilbert, 1880)

Synonyms
- Sebastichthys rastrelliger Jordan & Gilbert, 1880; Sebastodes rastrelliger (Jordan & Gilbert, 1880)

= Sebastes rastrelliger =

Species of fish

Sebastes rastrelliger, the grass rockfish, is a species of marine ray-finned fish belonging to the subfamily Sebastinae, the rockfishes, part of the family Scorpaenidae. It is native to the waters of the eastern Pacific Ocean.

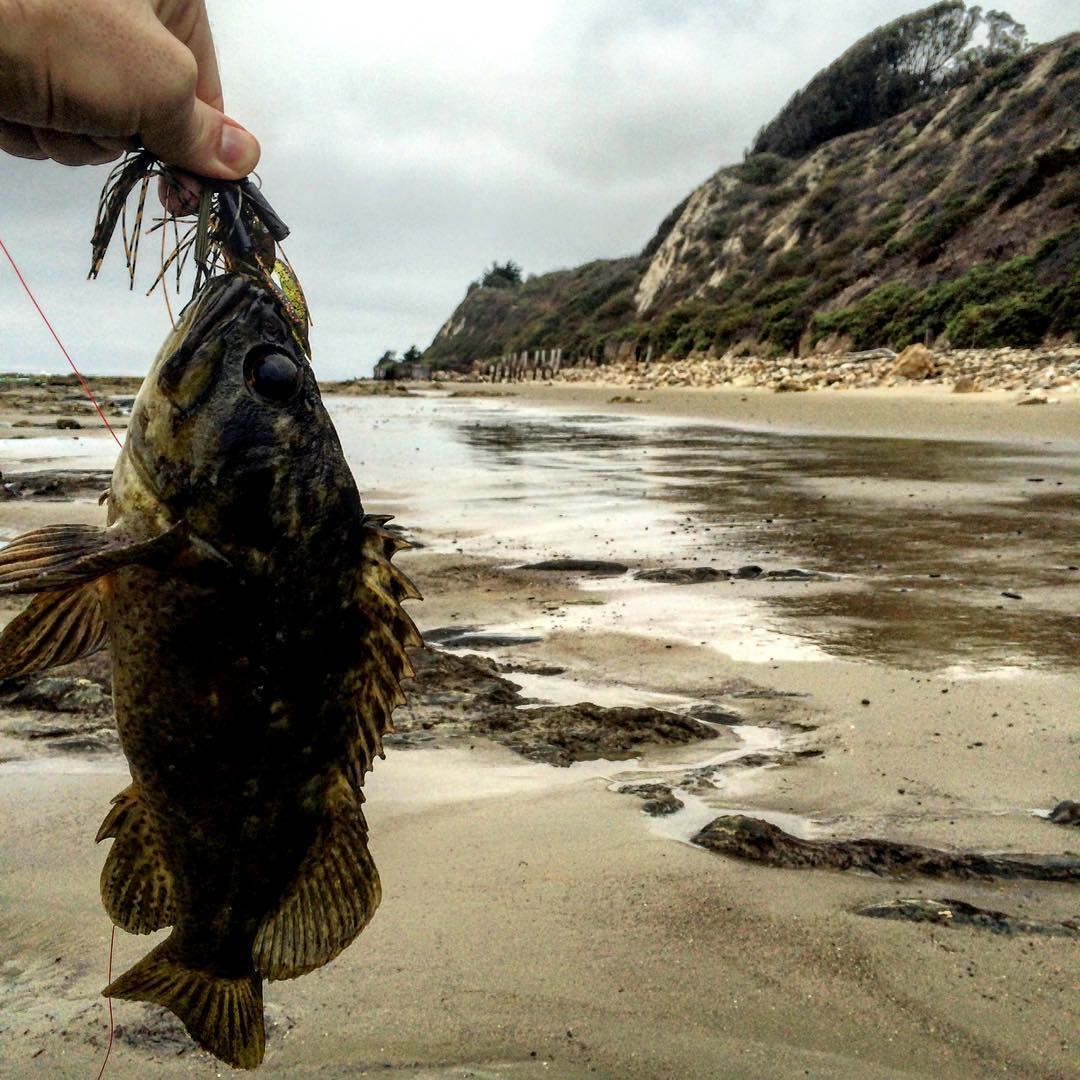
Grass Rock Fish (Sebastes rastrelliger) caught off the coast of Goleta California

== Taxonomy ==
Sebastes rastrelliger was first formally described as Sebastichthys rastrelliger in 1880 by the American ichthyologists David Starr Jordan and Charles Henry Gilbert with the type locality given as Point Conception to Santa Catalina Island in California. Some authorities place this species in the subgenus Pteropodus. The specific name rastrelliger is a compound of rastrella, a diminutive of rastrum which means "rake" with iger meaning "to bear", a reference to the short gill rakers as described by Jordan and Gilbert.

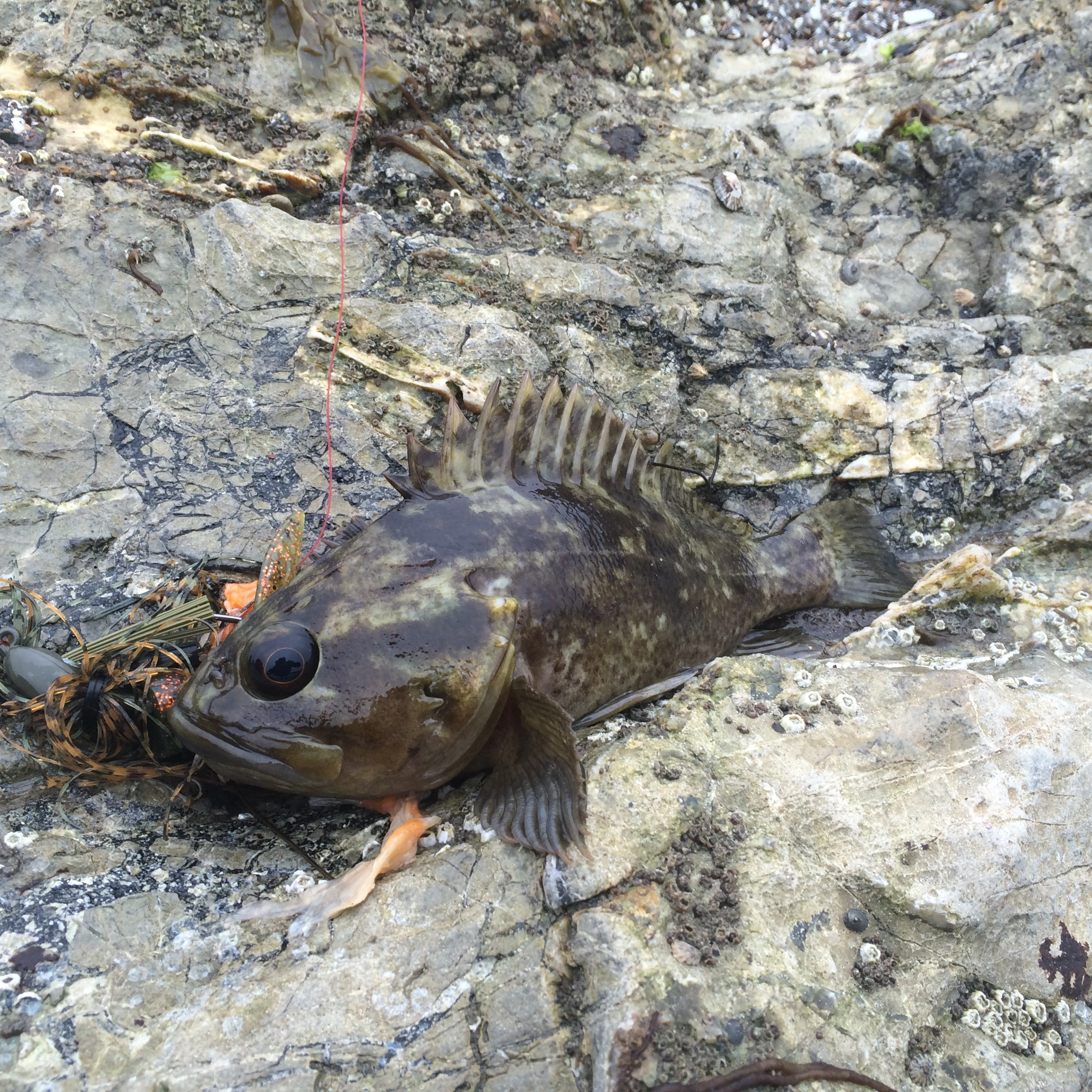
Small Grass Rockfish

== Description ==
Sebastes rastrelliger has a body which has a depth of around one third of its standard length with a broad head which has a tapering snout. The dorsal fin has 13 spines and 12 to 14 soft rays while the anal fin has 3 spines and 6 soft rays. The caudal fin is broad and rounded and the caudal peduncle is wide. This species attains a maximum total length of 56 cm (22 in). The overall colour of this species is dark green fading to whitish on the ventral part of the body,

== Distribution and habitat ==
Sebastes rastrelliger is found in the eastern Pacific Ocean along the western coast of North America. They primarily range from Cedros Island in Baja California to Yaquina Bay in Oregon, but some live as far north as Ucluelet on Vancouver Island in British Columbia. It is a demersal fish found at depths down to 46 m (151 ft) but are typically found in less than 15 m (49 ft). This is a shallow water species in which the juveniles and adults occur on hard structures, such as reefs, and among kelp beds where there are crevices they can use as shelters.

== Biology ==
Sebastes rastrelliger is a predatory species feeding on crustaceans and smaller fishes such as juvenile surfperches and midshipmen (Porichthys spp). They have been found to live up to 23 years with the males and females growing at roughly the same rate and have similar maximum sizes. In southern California half the fish are sexually mature at 4 years old and a length of 23.5 cm (9.3 in), and all are sexually mature at 5 years old and at a length of 27.5 cm (10.8 in). The females bear between 80,000 and 760,000 eggs in a season and the larvae are all released simultaneously. In southerbn California breeding occurs between January and March with peaking in January. Newborn larvae are planktonic have standard lengths between 4.25 and 4.5 mm (0.167 and 0.177 in) and settle on the substrate when they reach 2.7 cm (1.1 in), appearing in shallow waters and tidal pools between spring and summer. The larvae do not disperse far and the adults are sedentary, remaining within their home range for most of their life.

== Fisheries ==
Sebastes rastrelliger is an important species in commercial and recreational fisheries.
