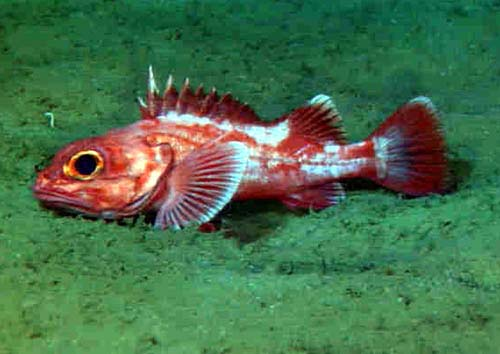
- Longspine thornyhead (Sebastolobus altivelis)

Scientific classification
- Kingdom: Animalia
- Phylum: Chordata
- Class: Actinopterygii
- Order: Perciformes
- Family: Scorpaenidae
- Subfamily: Sebastolobinae; Matsubara, 1943

Genera
- Adelosebastes; Sebastolobus; Trachyscorpia

= Sebastolobinae =

Tribe of fishes

Sebastolobinae is a subfamily of marine ray-finned fishes belonging to the family Scorpaenidae in the order Perciformes. Many species have the common name thornyhead.

== Taxonomy ==
Sebastolobini was first formally recognised as a grouping in 1943 by the Japanese ichthyologist Kiyomatsu Matsubara. More recently, authorities like Eschmeyer's Catalog of Fishes, who treat the clade referred to as Sebastinae as a family, treat the Sebastolobini as a subfamily and call this grouping Sebastolobinae.

== Genera ==
Sebastolobinae contains three genera with 11 species, most in Trachyscorpia.

- Adelosebastes Eschmeyer, T. Abe & Nakano, 1979
- Sebastolobus Gill, 1881
- Trachyscorpia Ginsburg, 1953
