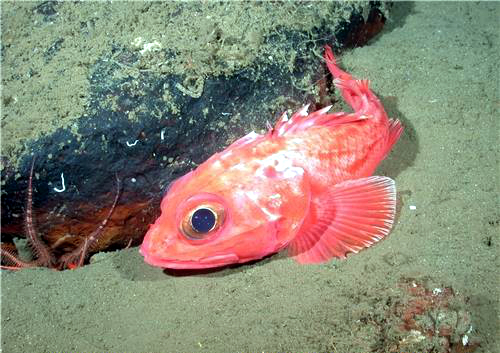

Conservation status
- Endangered (IUCN 2.3)

Scientific classification
- Kingdom: Animalia
- Phylum: Chordata
- Class: Actinopterygii
- Division: Teleostei
- Order: Perciformes
- Family: Scorpaenidae
- Genus: Sebastolobus
- Species: S. alascanus

Binomial name
- Sebastolobus alascanus T. H. Bean, 1890

Synonyms
- Sebastodes alascanus (Bean, 1890)

= Shortspine thornyhead =

Species of fish

The shortspine thornyhead (Sebastolobus alascanus), also known as the channel rockcod, shortspine channel rockfish or spinycheek rockfish, is a species of marine ray-finned fish belonging to the subfamily Sebastinae, the rockfishes, part of the family Scorpaenidae. It is sometimes referred to as the "idiot fish" or "idiot cod" due to its oversized head and eyes. It is found in the northern and northeastern Pacific Ocean.

== Taxonomy ==
The shortspine thornyhead was first formally described in 1890 by the American ichthyologist Tarleton Hoffman Bean with the type locality given as being off Trinity Islands, near Kodiak Island, in Alaska. The specific name alascanus means "Alaskan" and refers to the type locality.

== Description ==
The shortspine thornyhead has a large head with a strong spiny ridge, and an elongate, tapering body which grows to a maximum length of 80 cm (31 in). The dorsal fin has 15 to 17 spines and 8 to 9 soft rays and the anal fin has 3 spines and 4 to 5 soft rays. There is a deep notch in the pectoral fin and the caudal fin is rounded. The general color of this fish is bright red with varying amounts of black on the fins and a pale-colored gill chamber.

== Distribution ==
The shortspine thornyhead is found in the North Pacific Ocean from the Sea of Okhotsk north as far as the Navarin Canyon in the Bering Sea and from Stalemate Bank and Ulm Plateau in the Aleutian Islands east and south to Cedros Island in Baja California. It is a demersal fish with a depth range which is between 17 and 1,600 m (56 and 5,249 ft) but it is more usually found at depths less than 100 metres (330 ft).

== Biology ==
Shortspine thornyhead grow slowly and have long lives of possibly up to 80 or 100 years. The females grow to larger sizes than the males, reaching sexual maturity at approximately 18 cm (7.1 in), or when they are 8 to 10 years old. The females are fertilized internally and extrude the fertilised eggs in pelagic, gelatinous masses. The young fish migrate to deeper water as they mature Spawning occurs between December and May along the Pacific coasts of contiguous United States and between April and May in the Gulf of Alaska. These fishes are predators of shrimp, crabs, zooplankton, amphipods, and other benthic invertebrates. As adults they live predominantly in the oxygen minimum zone (OMZ), and thus require specific adaptations/exaptations in order to overcome the problems posed by the extremely low levels of oxygen saturation. Allowing for an increased ventilation frequency during exposure to progressively hypoxic conditions, as compared to its more shallow relative Scorpaena guttata, enables S. alascanus to compensate for the inherent low concentrations of oxygen in the OMZ. Further, heightened levels of lactate dehydrogenase, specifically the anaerobic isoform- LDH-A in the heart and muscles of S. alascanus, suggests an adaptive mechanism for ATP production during low oxygen availability.

== Status ==
Separate stock assessments for shortspine thornyhead in the waters off Alaska, British Columbia, and the West Coast of the United States have all estimated the stock as healthy (above the management limits) with overfishing not occurring. The IUCN status is listed as "Endangered" based on an assessment conducted in 2000 estimating a biomass reduction of 53% between the 1960s and 1998.

== Nutrition ==
Nutrition information for shortspine thornyhead is as follows.

Serving Size	100g
=== Calories ===	114 kcal
=== Protein ===	15.9 g
Protein calories: 68 kcal Protein calories % : 60%	
=== Fat ===	5.1 g
Fat calories: 46 kcal Fat calories % : 40%	
=== Carbohydrate ===	0.0 g
Carbohydrate calories: 0 kcal Carbohydrate calories % : 0.0%	
Cholesterol	44.8 mg
Sodium	41.8 mg

Serving Size	per 100g	per 100 kcal
Omega 3 (EPA+DHA)	990 mg	869 mg
Vitamin B3	1.1 mg	0.97 mg
Vitamin B6	0.1 mg	0.1 mg
Vitamin B12	0.04 mcg	0.04 mcg
Vitamin D	<46 IU	<40 IU
Vitamin E	4.0 mg	3.5 mg
Calcium	6.2 mg	5.4 mg
Magnesium	18.3 mg	16.1 mg
Phosphorus	162 mg	142 mg
Potassium	322 mg	282 mg
Selenium	40 mcg	35 mcg
