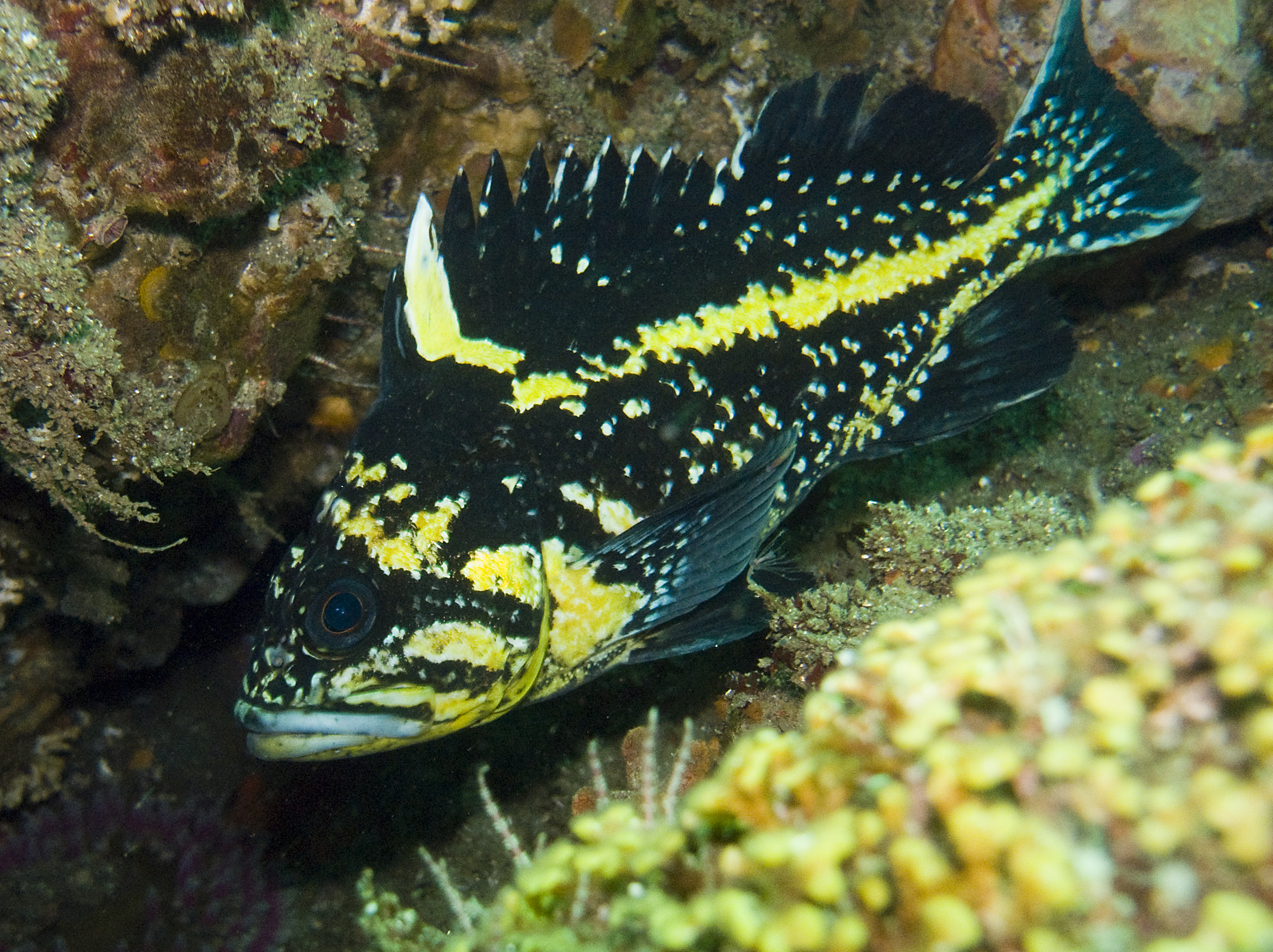
- In Neah Bay, Washington

Scientific classification
- Kingdom: Animalia
- Phylum: Chordata
- Class: Actinopterygii
- Division: Teleostei
- Order: Perciformes
- Family: Scorpaenidae
- Genus: Sebastes
- Species: S. nebulosus

Binomial name
- Sebastes nebulosus Ayres, 1854

Synonyms
- Sebastodes nebulosus (Ayres, 1854); Sebastes fasciatus Girard, 1854; Sebastichthys fasciolaris Jordan & Gilbert, 1880

= China rockfish =

Species of fish

The China rockfish (Sebastes nebulosus), the yellowstripe rockfish or yellowspotted rockfish, is a species of marine ray-finned fish belonging to the subfamily Sebastinae, the rockfishes, part of the family Scorpaenidae. It is native to the waters of the Pacific Ocean off western North America.

== Taxonomy ==
The China rockfish was first formally described in 1854 by the American zoologist William Orville Ayres with the type locality given as Santa Barbara and Monterey, California. Some authorities place this species in the subgenus Pteropodus. The specific name nebulosus means "cloudy" a reference to the yellow body mottled with dark brown. The species was actually described by both Ayres and Girard in the same year, with Girard naming the species S. fasciatus, but it was thought that that name had already been used for the Acadian redfish by David Humphreys Storer and thus Ayres' choice prevailed.

== Distribution and habitat ==
The China rockfish is found in the eastern Pacific Ocean off the western coast of North America from Kodiak Island in Alaska to Redondo Beach and San Nicholas Island in California. It is at its most common from central British Columbia south to central California.

It is associated with reefs at depths between 3 and 128 m (9.8 and 419.9 ft) but it is typically found in water less than 92 m (302 ft) deep.

== Description ==
The China rockfish has a compact body with a small mouth. They have a concave intraorbital space and robust spines on the head but there are none above the eyes. The dorsal fin has deeply incised membranes between its long spines, there are 13 spines and 13 or 14 soft rays in the dorsal fin while the anal fin has 3 spines and 6 to 8 soft rays. Their caudal fin is rounded. This species attains a maximum total length of 45 cm (18 in) and a maximum published weight of 1.7 kg (3.7 lb).

The overall color may be blue or black, marked with yellow mottling which is mixed with some white mottling. The main distinguishing feature of this species is the clear yellow stripe which starts on the dorsal fin near the third dorsal fin spine and extends obliquely to the lateral line then runs along that line to make a shape like an ice hockey stick. The pelvic, anal and caudal fins are dark colored.

== Biology ==
The china rockfish is a solitary and territorial species and if alarmed they will quickly take shelter in a cavity or crevice in the reef. They are known to live for up to 79 years and they become sexually mature when they reach a total length of around 30 cm (12 in). They are ovoviviparous and the females extrude the larvae in January to August. The pelagic larvae leave the plankton to settle between one and two months after being born.

The spines in the dorsal and anal fins are mildly venomous but are also used to wedge the fish in narrow hiding spaces in the reef. The China rockfish is a sedentary species and studies have shown they rarely move more than 10 m (33 ft) from their preferred shelter. They have been known to live in the same rock crevices as the Giant Pacific octopus (Enteroctopus dofleini).

The larvae feed on plankton and the juveniles prey largely on crustaceans. The adults also eat crustaceans but also prey on brittle stars, mollusks, and small fishes. The predators of the juveniles are sea birds, porpoises, and other fishes, including rockfishes, lingcod, cabezon and salmon. The adults are preyed on by sharks, dolphins, seals, lingcod, and possibly North American river otters (Lontra canadensis).

== Fisheries ==
China rockfish are an important component of the live fish fishery. There has been no formal stock assessment for this species and it is managed as a species within the Nearshore Rockfish group regulated by the Pacific Fishery Management Council. Commercial fishing methods include hook and line, longline, and trapping. It is also important as a recreational fishing quarry.

=== Stock status ===
A stock assessment of China rockfish conducted in 2015 estimated the stock to be at 28% of unfished level in California, but less depleted in Oregon and Washington, at 62% and 73%, respectively. However, the stock in California waters (which included only the area up to Cape Mendocino) was estimated as showing an increasing trend in abundance, as this area had seen larger reductions in catch than the other areas.
