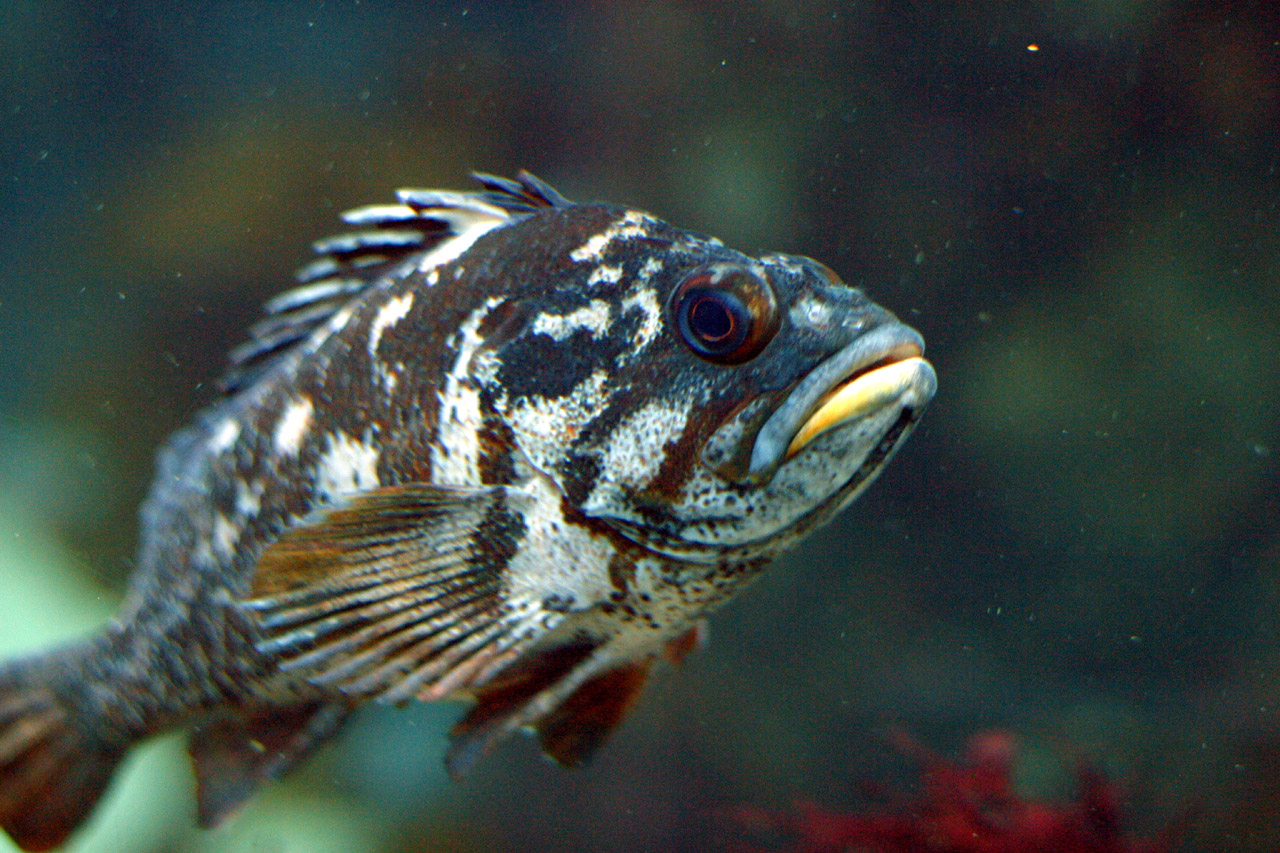
- At the Monterey Bay Aquarium

Scientific classification
- Kingdom: Animalia
- Phylum: Chordata
- Class: Actinopterygii
- Order: Perciformes
- Family: Scorpaenidae
- Genus: Sebastes
- Species: S. carnatus

Binomial name
- Sebastes carnatus (D. S. Jordan & C. H. Gilbert, 1880)

Synonyms
- Sebastichthys carnatus Jordan & Gilbert, 1880

= Gopher rockfish =

Species of fish

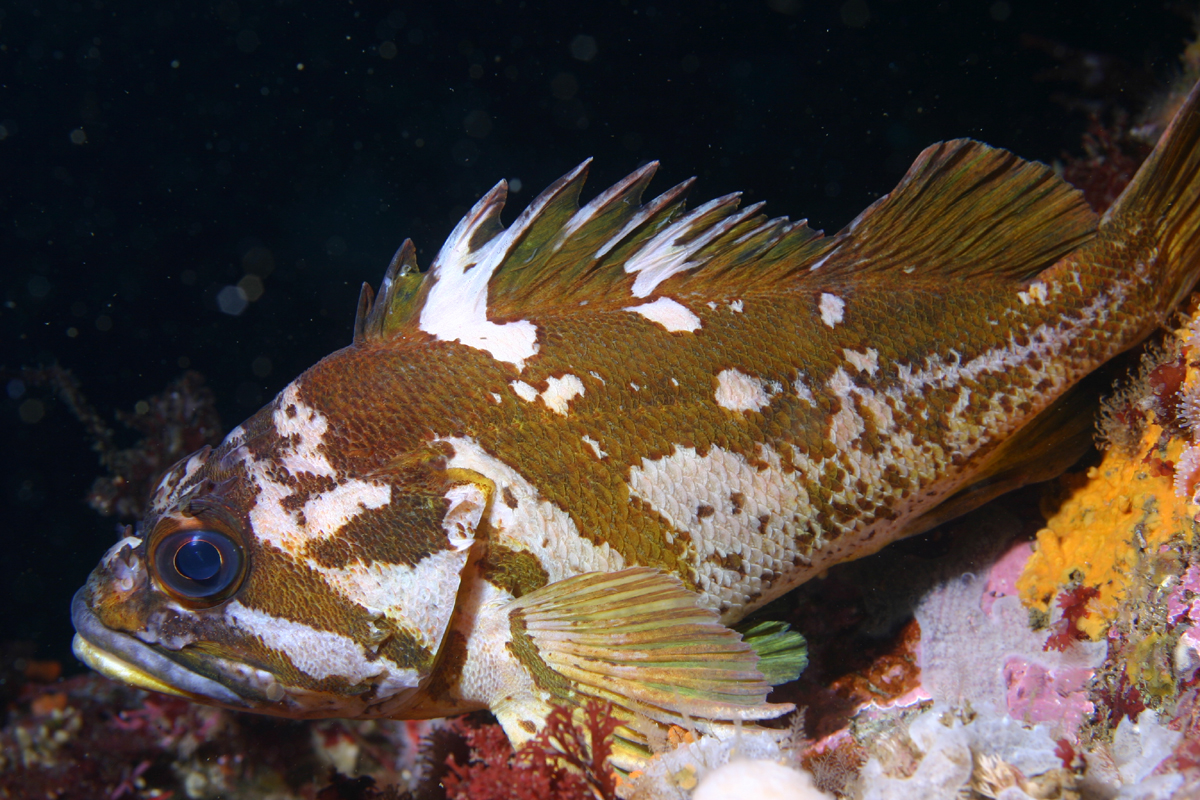
A gopher rockfish resting on top of rocks

The gopher rockfish (Sebastes carnatus), also known as the gopher sea perch, is a species of marine ray-finned fish belonging to the subfamily Sebastinae, the rockfishes, part of the family Scorpaenidae. It is found in the eastern Pacific, primarily off California.

== Taxonomy ==
The gopher rockfish was originally described in 1880 as Sebastichthys carnatus by the American ichthyologists David Starr Jordan and Charles Henry Gilbert with the type locality given as the Monterey Bay, California. Some authorities place this species in the subgenus Pteropodus. The specific name carnatus means "fleshy" or "flesh-colored", alluding to the background color of this fish.

== Description ==
The gopher rockfish is a deep, stout bodied fish with a steep dorsal profile. The body is as deep as 34% to 38% of its standard length. They have many spines on the head and body. The overall color is dark brown, black, and greenish fading to reddish brown on the belly. There is a row of flesh-colored or whitish spotting and blotches on their back reaching up to and onto the dorsal fin and irregular pale patches on their flanks. There is a dark stripe running rearwards from the eye and another on the upper jaw. The head is of average length for this genus and has a short snout with a small terminal mouth and large eyes which bulge over the dorsal profile of the head. The caudal fin is truncate. The dorsal fin has 13 spines and 12 to 14 rays while the anal fin has 3 spines and 5 to 7 soft rays. This species grows to a maximum total length of 43 cm (17 in) and 2.83 kg (6.2 lb).

== Distribution and habitat ==
Gopher rockfish are found in the northeastern Pacific Ocean off the Western coast of North America. They are known from as far north as Cape Blanco in Oregon, down to Ensenada in southern Baja California. They are commonest between Northern Baja California and Northern California. It is a demersal species that is encountered as solitary and highly territorial individuals with nearby shelters on rock structures or within kelp forests at depths from 12 to 50 m (39 to 164 ft).

== Biology and diet ==
The gopher rockfish is a territorial species which defends a home territory on the seabed excluding other rockfish. It is a nocturnal fish, spending the day sheltering in cavities and crevices. They leave their shelter at dusk to forage. The juveniles feed on planktonic crustaceans while the adults prey on cephalopods, gastropods, brittle stars, crabs (notably the Cancrinae family), shrimp and polychaete worms. They also eat smaller fish such as juvenile rockfish, particularly blue rockfish (Sebastes mystinus), sculpins, juvenile surfperch, kelpfishes, and plainfin midshipman (Porichthys notatus).

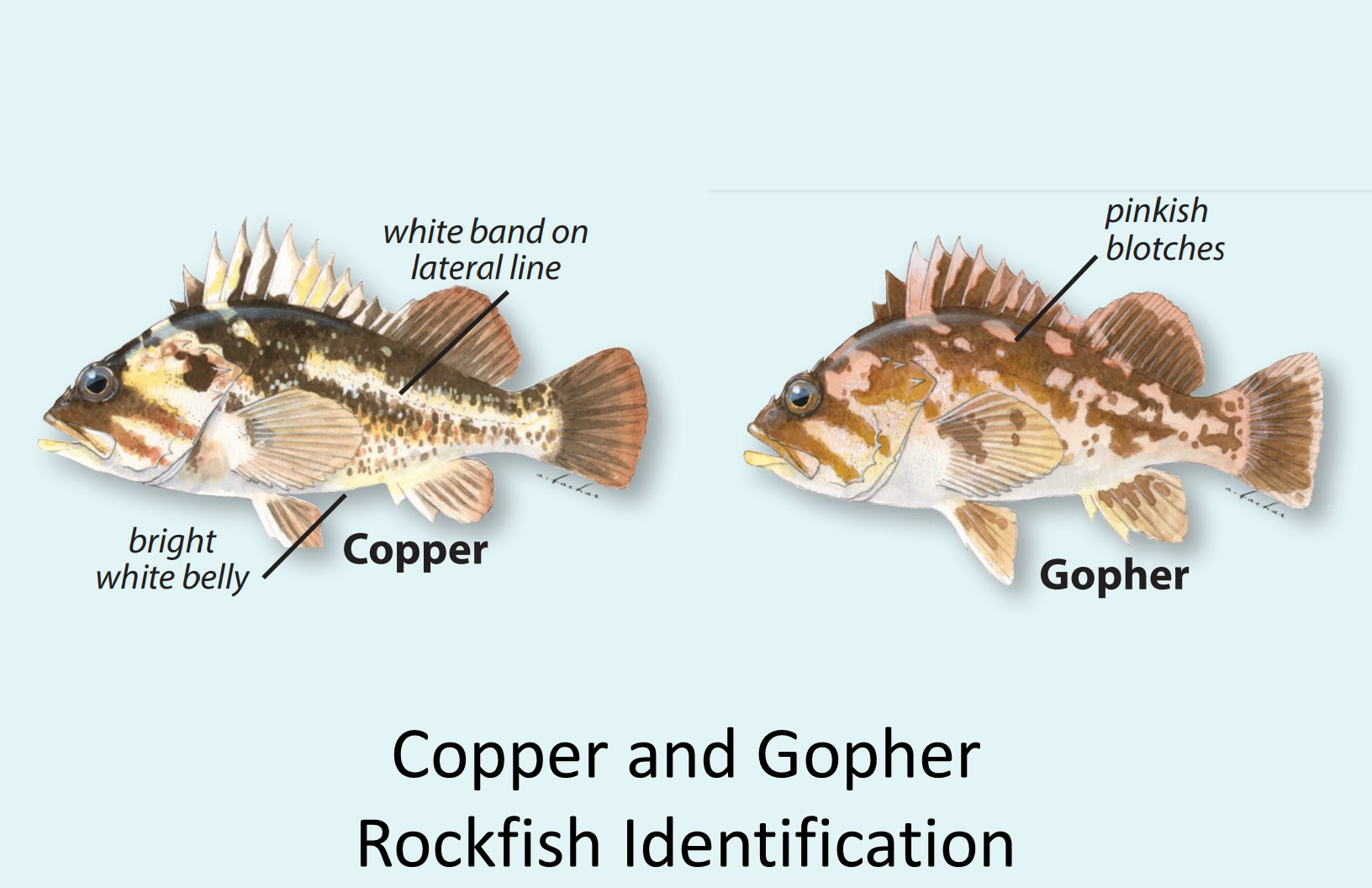
Comparison with the similar Copper Rockfish (Sebastes caurinus). Notably, the posterior of the copper rockfish's lateral line is often lighter in color compared to the blotchy pattern on the gopher rockfish.

Like other rockfish, it is a viviparous species. spawning happens from January through July, and they give birth to live young after gestation. Compared to other rockfish, gophers mature quicker, at 3-4 years of age, but the rate of maturity depends on the region. Males mature and grow faster than females.

They are known to live for up to 30 years, possibly to 35, but it is rare for the fish to be older than 20.

== Fisheries and relation to humans ==
Gopher rockfish are considered of moderate importance to commercial fisheries. They are mainly caught by recreational anglers fishing from shore for other near-shore rockfishes, and can be a relatively common catch, including from boats and kayaks. Larger fish are found in deeper waters. They are considered good eating fish, and may be sold live or frozen.

== Genetics ==
A PCR-RFLP genetic sex marker has been identified for gopher rockfish, which can successfully distinguish males and females. The marker potentially also works in the closely related black-and-yellow rockfish, but it does not seem to successfully distinguish males and females in various other rockfish species. Chromosome 19 has been identified as a putative sex chromosome for the species.
