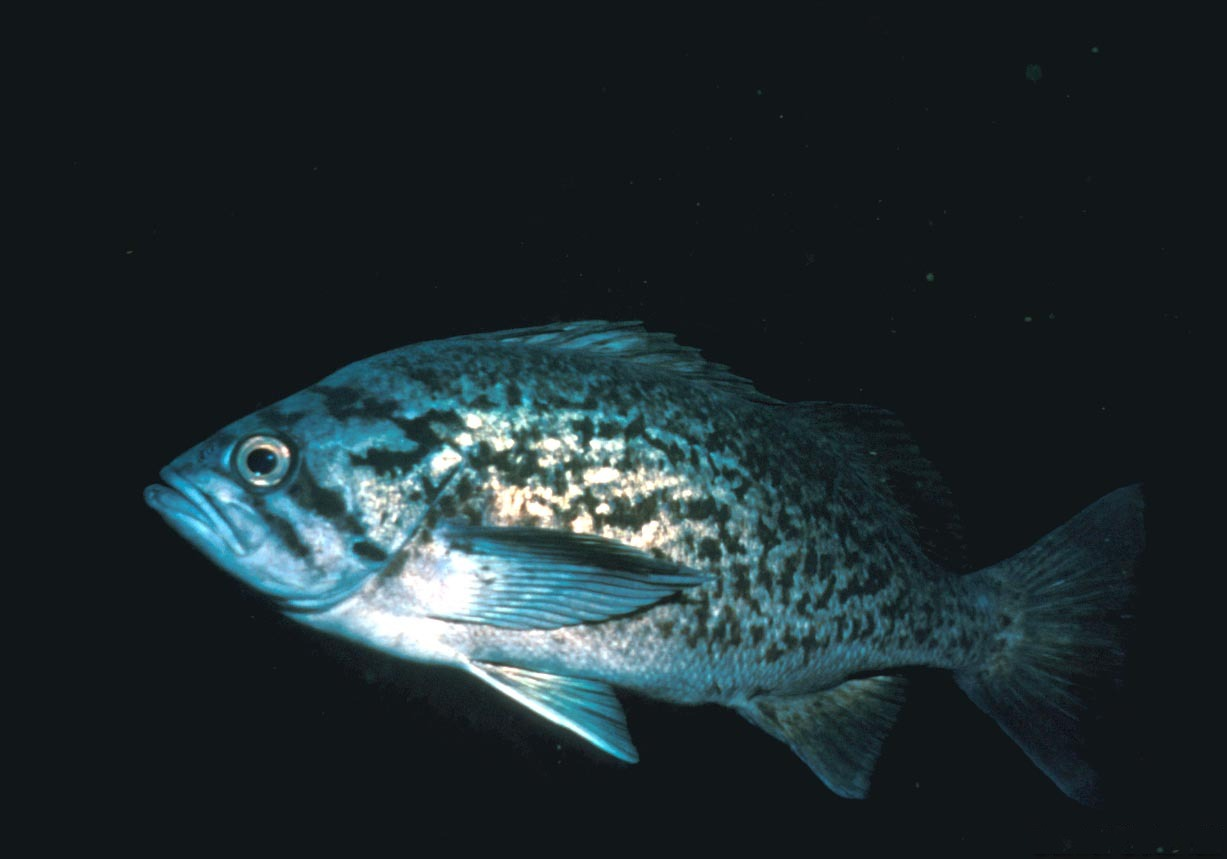

Scientific classification
- Kingdom: Animalia
- Phylum: Chordata
- Class: Actinopterygii
- Order: Perciformes
- Family: Scorpaenidae
- Genus: Sebastes
- Species: S. mystinus

Binomial name
- Sebastes mystinus (Jordan & Gilbert, 1881)

Synonyms
- Sebastichthys mystinus Jordan & Gilbert, 1881; Sebastodes mystinus (Jordan & Gilbert, 1881)

= Blue rockfish =

Species of fish

The blue rockfish (Sebastes mystinus) or blue seaperch, is a species of marine ray-finned fish belonging to the subfamily Sebastinae, the rockfishes, part of the family Scorpaenidae. It is found in the northeastern Pacific Ocean, ranging from northern Baja California to central Oregon.

== Taxonomy ==
Sebastes mystinus was first formally described in 1881 by the American ichthyologists David Starr Jordan and Charles Henry Gilbert with the type locality given as San Francisco, California. Some authorities place this species in the subgenus Sebastosomus. The specific name mystinus means "initiated one" or "priest", the reason for choosing this name was not explained but it is thought that it derives from the Portuguese speaking fishers' local name for this species in the Monterey Bay area, Pesce Pretre, i.e. the "Priest-fish" an allusion to the dark color of this species compared to its congeners.

== Description ==
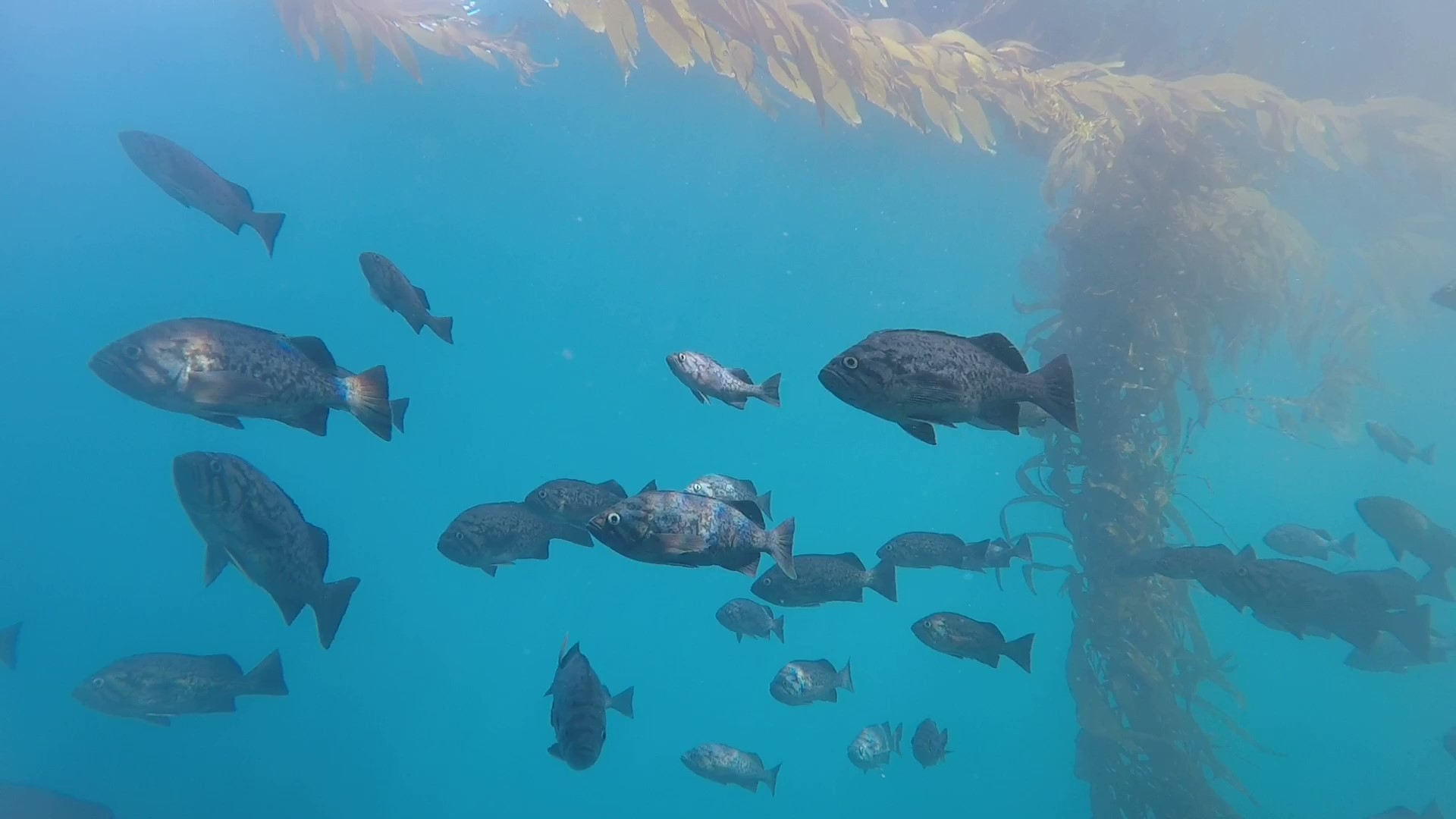
Blue rockfish off Cannery Point, Point Lobos State Natural Reserve

Blue rockfish have a relatively smooth and oval appearance compared to other members of Sebastes, with very few head spines. Color is a bluish black to gray, with some darker mottling, including a pair of stripes angling down and back from the eye. The terminal mouths are small for rockfish. Length ranges up to 55 to 60 cm, and weights up to 3.8 kg.

=== Ecology ===
Blue rockfish seem to be adapted to diurnal hunting on small, transparent plankton. Juveniles consume tiny crustacea such as copepods and barnacle larvae (in some cases having a significant effect on the population), while adults shift to larger types, such as free-swimming tunicates, jellyfish, gastropods, squids, young rockfish, and drifting plant fragments.

== Distribution ==
Blue rockfish occur from northern Baja California to central Oregon. Previous records further north are due to confusion with the deacon rockfish (S. diaconus), which was described as a separate species genetically and scientifically in 2009 and 2015, respectively.

While they have been caught at depths of over 500 m, most live near to the surface, down to 90 m.

== Genetics ==
A potential PCR-RFLP genetic sex marker developed for gopher rockfish does not successfully distinguish male and female blue rockfish.

== Fishing and management ==
Blue rockfish were once an important part of the California fishery; they were the most common rockfish marketed in San Francisco and San Diego during the 19th century, but have since declined in popularity. They continue to be of interest as game fish, and are among the most common types landed by boat anglers; in fact, there is evidence of overfishing in Monterey Bay and southern California.
