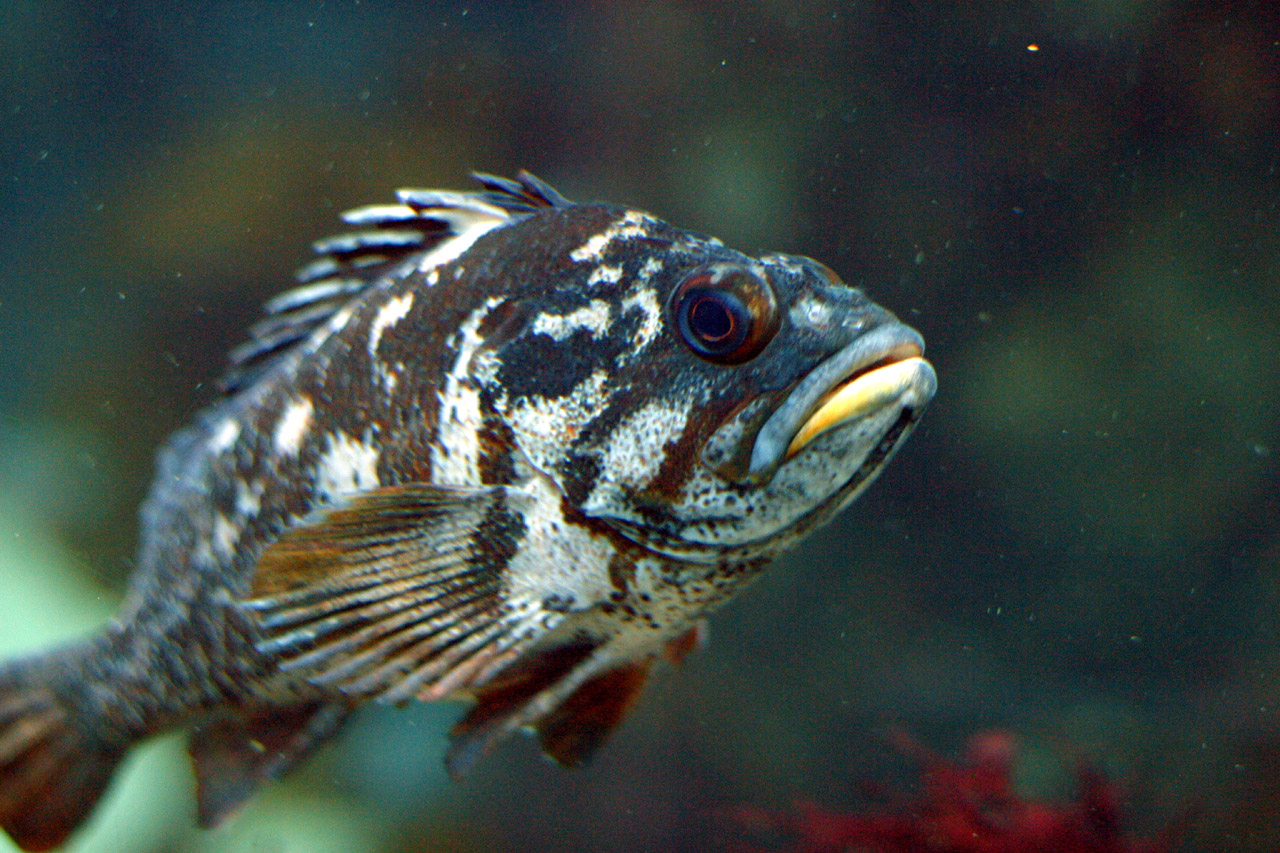
- Gopher rockfish, Sebastes carnatus

Scientific classification
- Kingdom: Animalia
- Phylum: Chordata
- Class: Actinopterygii
- Division: Teleostei
- Order: Perciformes
- Family: Scorpaenidae
- Subfamily: Sebastinae; Kaup, 1873

Genera
- see text

= Sebastinae =

Subfamily of fishes

Sebastinae is a subfamily of marine fish belonging to the family Scorpaenidae in the order Scorpaeniformes. Their common names include rockfishes, rock perches, ocean perches, sea perches and rockcods. Despite the latter name, they are not closely related to the cods in the genus Gadus, nor the rock cod, Lotella rhacina.

== Taxonomy ==
Sebastinae, or Sebastidae, was first formally recognised as a grouping in 1873 by the German naturalist Johann Jakob Kaup. Some authorities recognise this family as distinct from Scorpaenidae. FishBase, a finfish database generated by a consortium of academic institutions, does, but the United States Federal government's Integrated Taxonomic Information System and the 5th Edition of Fishes of the World do not, FotW classify it as a subfamily of the Scorpaenidae. Eschmeyer's Catalog of Fishes classifies it as a subfamily of Scorpaenidae, but also classifies the Sebastolobinae (previously considered a tribe of the Sebastinae) as a different subfamily.

== Genera ==
The following genera are placed in this group:

- Subfamily Sebastinae Kaup, 1873
  - Helicolenus Goode & Bean, 1896
  - Hozukius Matsubara, 1934
  - Sebastes Cuvier, 1829
  - Sebastiscus Jordan & Starks, 1904

== Characteristics ==
Sebastinae species have a compressed body with the head typically having ridges and spines. The gill membranes are not attached to the isthmus. There is a venom gland in the spines of the dorsal, anal and pelvic fins. The largest species is the shortraker rockfish (Sebastes borealis) which attains a maximum total length of 108 cm (43 in) while the smallest species is Sebastes koreanus which reaches a maximum total length of 13.7 cm (5.4 in).

== Distribution and habitat ==
Sebastinae rockfishes are found in the Pacific, Indian and Atlantic Oceans with most species in the largest genus, the ovoviviparous Sebastes with over 100 species, in the North Pacific. They can be found in marine and brackish waters.
