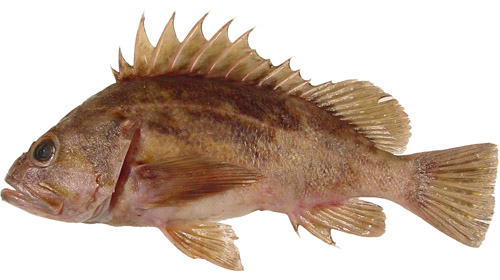

Scientific classification
- Kingdom: Animalia
- Phylum: Chordata
- Class: Actinopterygii
- Order: Perciformes
- Family: Scorpaenidae
- Genus: Sebastes
- Species: S. auriculatus

Binomial name
- Sebastes auriculatus (Girard, 1854)

Synonyms
- Sebastodes auriculatus (Girard, 1854)

= Brown rockfish =

Species of fish

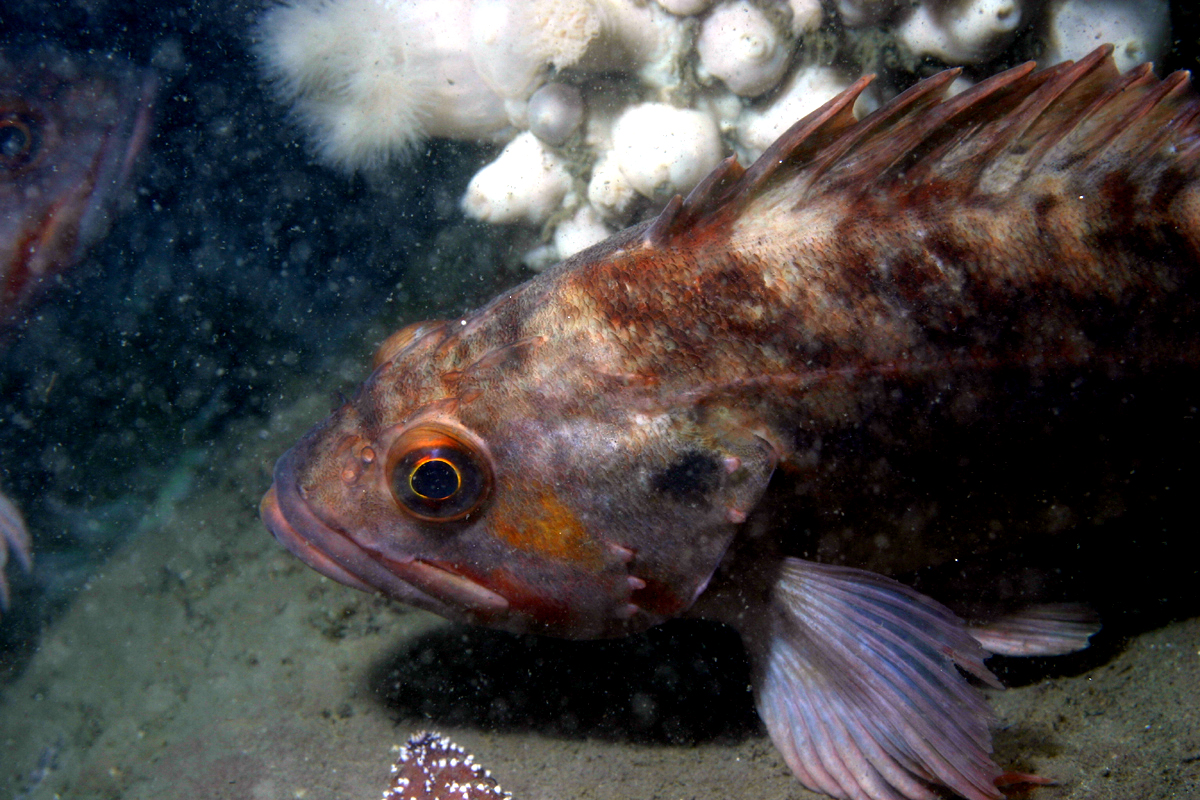
A brown rockfish (Sebastes auriculatus) with a distinctive dark splotch at the top of the operculum. This spot is helpful to differentiate the brown rockfish from other sebastes species.

The brown rockfish (Sebastes auriculatus), whose other names include brown seaperch, chocolate bass, brown bass and brown bomber, is a species of marine ray-finned fish belonging to the subfamily Sebastinae, the rockfishes, part of the family Scorpaenidae. It is found in the northeastern Pacific Ocean.

== Taxonomy ==
The brown rockfish was first formally described as Sebastodes auriculatus in 1854 by the French ichthyologist Charles Frédéric Girard with the type locality given as San Francisco, California. Some authorities place this species in the subgenus Auctospina. The specific name auriculatus means "eared" thought to be an allusion to the dark spot on rear margin of operculum.

== Description ==
The Brown Rockfish has a deep body which has a depth of 33% to 37% of its standard length and they typically have spines on the head which has a small terminal mouth. The overall color is reddish-brown with many dark markings, these include a dark spot on the rear upper angle of the operculum. The eyes frequently show a red or orange tint. There are 2 orange or orange-brown lines radiating backwards from each of the upper jaw and the eye. The body is covered in scales. The spines on the head are robust and are made up of nasal, preocular, postocular, tympanic, coronal, parietal, and nuchal spines, although in some specimens the coronal and nuchal spines can be absent and they never have supraorbital spines. The space between the eyes may be flat or slightly bulging. The caudal fin is rounded or truncated. The dorsal fin has 13 spines and 12-15 soft rays while the anal fin has 3 spines and 5-8 soft rays. This species grows to a maximum total length of 56 cm (22 in). The maximum recorded weight is 3.0 kg (6.6 lb).

== Distribution and habitat ==
The brown rockfish is native to the northeastern Pacific. Its range extends from southern Baja California to Prince William Sound in the northern Gulf of Alaska. These fish are most abundant in the central and southern parts of Puget Sound and from southern Baja California to Bodega Bay in northern California. The brown rockfish occurs at depths from the intertidal zone down to 287 m (942 ft) and prefer areas with rocky patches or hard substrates, inhabiting areas which vary in relief from low to high. They also frequently occur around artificial structures and objects such as piers and other man-made objects, like marine debris, such as tires. Adults are primarily found in deeper waters, while juveniles inhabit shallower areas.

== Biology ==
The brown rockfish has a long pelagic juvenile stage which spends two and a half to three months in the water column before they settle in shallow water to depths of 36 m (118 ft). This settlement can take place as early as May and the juveniles and subadults are common close to the bottom in bays and estuaries. In some areas, like San Francisco Bay, the subadults migrate as far as 50 km (31 mi) out to sea from the more sheltered coastal waters. They often mix with copper (S. caurinus), calico (S. dallii), vermilion (S. miniatus) and canary rockfishes (S. pinniger) in deeper water, and in Puget Sound they mix with quillback rockfishes (S. maliger). It is often a solitary species or one which forms small aggregations and they are typically found in more turbid areas than other rockfishes. Juveniles and subadults are thought to have relatively small home ranges. The juveniles are prey to harbor seals, king salmon, seabirds, and lingcod. The brown rockfish feeds primarily at night on small fishes, crab, shrimp, and other small invertebrates. During the day this fish tends to lie on the seabed among seaweed, next to rocks, or in other hidden locations. Its spines are venomous and can cause painful injuries to the unwary. This is an ovoviviparous species in which fertilization occurs internally, and birth is given to live young. They are known to live for up to 34 years, but often don't live over 25. They are known to hybridize with quillback and copper rockfishes in Puget Sound.

== Fisheries ==
The brown rockfish was common in fish markets near San Francisco in the 19th century, as they are caught in bays and other shallow waters. Modern commercial fisheries regard this species as of moderate importance in fisheries for fresh fish and of greater importance in fisheries for live fish. Artisanal fisheries take this species on Baja California. It is an important quarry species for recreational fishers from Puget Sound south to northern Baja. The flesh is said to be palatable, with a mild flavor and the fish are generally fried or, for smaller fish, cooked whole.
