= Puget Sound =

Sound in Washington, United States

- x̌ʷəlč (Lushootseed)
- Satellite view of Puget Sound and surrounding waterways, taken by Sentinel-2 in September 2018

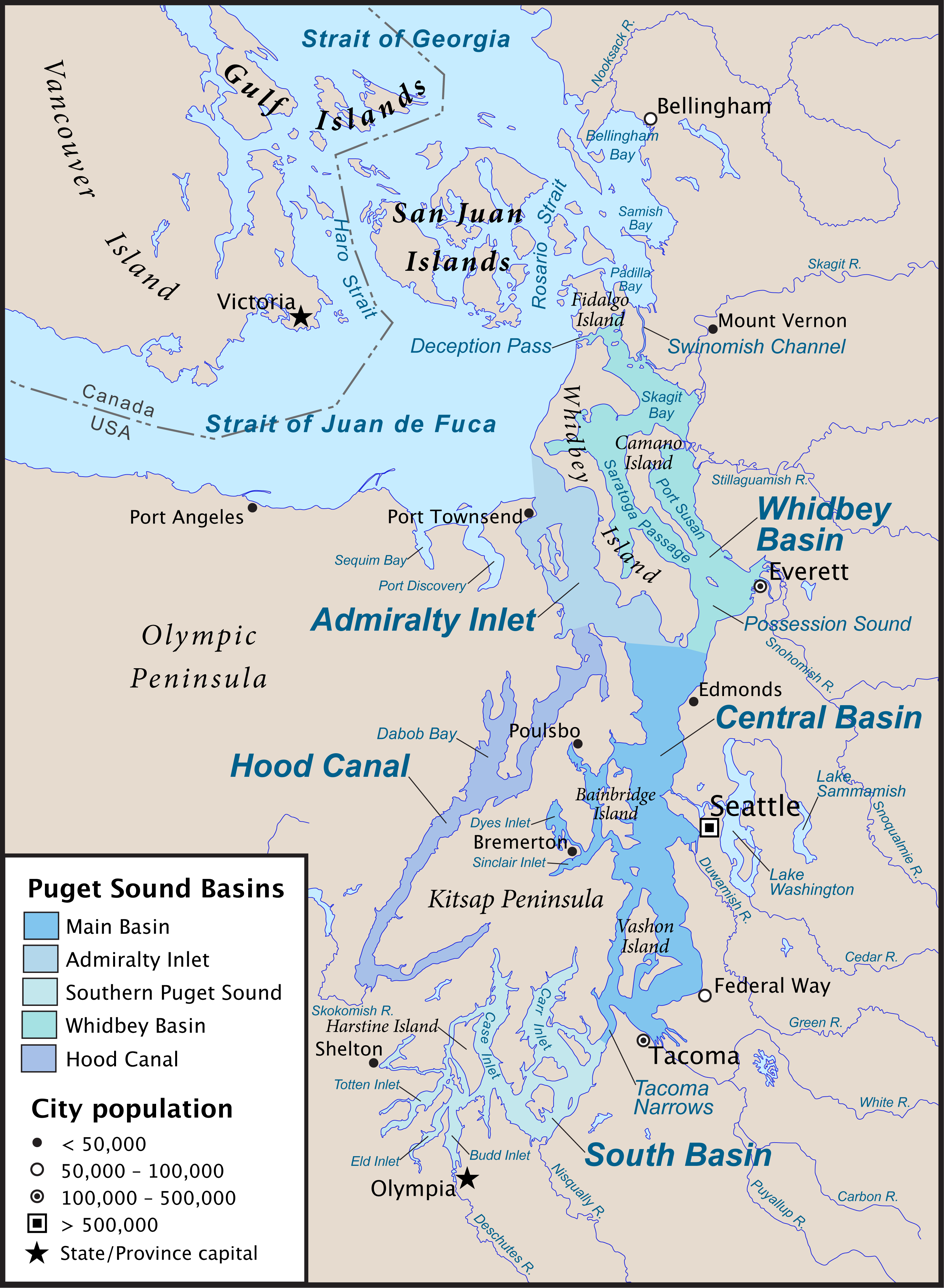
- Location: Puget Sound Lowlands, Washington, U.S.
- Coordinates: 47.6°N 122.4°W
- Etymology: Peter Puget
- Part of: Salish Sea
- Primary inflows: Deschutes River, Nisqually River, Puyallup River, Duwamish River, Cedar River, Snohomish River, Stillaguamish River, Skagit River
- Primary outflows: Admiralty Inlet, Deception Pass avg: 41,000 cu ft/s (1,200 m^{3}/s) max: 367,000 cu ft/s (10,400 m^{3}/s) min: 14,000 cu ft/s (400 m^{3}/s)
- Catchment area: 12,138 mi^{2} (31,440 km^{2})
- Max. length: 100 mi (160 km)
- Max. width: 10 mi (16 km)
- Surface area: 1,020 mi^{2} (2,600 km^{2})
- Average depth: 450 ft (140 m)
- Max. depth: 930 ft (280 m)
- Water volume: 26.5 mi^{3} (110 km^{3})
- Settlements: Seattle, Tacoma, Olympia, Everett, Bremerton

Puget Sound (Note: Lushootseed: x̌ʷəlč IPA: [ˈχʷəlt͡ʃ] WHULCH)) (/ˈpjuːdʒɪt/ PEW-jit) is a complex estuarine system of interconnected marine waterways and basins located on the northwest coast of the U.S. state of Washington. As a part of the Salish Sea, the sound has one major and two minor connections to the Strait of Juan de Fuca, which in turn connects to the open Pacific Ocean. The major connection is Admiralty Inlet; the minor connections are Deception Pass and the Swinomish Channel.

Puget Sound extends approximately 100 miles (160 km) from Deception Pass in the north to Olympia in the south. Its average depth is 450 feet (140 m) and its maximum depth, off Jefferson Point between Indianola and Kingston, is 930 feet (280 m). The depth of the main basin, between the southern tip of Whidbey Island and Tacoma, is approximately 600 feet (180 m).

In 2009, the term Salish Sea was established by the United States Board on Geographic Names as the collective waters of Puget Sound, the Strait of Juan de Fuca, and the Strait of Georgia. Sometimes the terms "Puget Sound" and "Puget Sound and adjacent waters" are used for not only Puget Sound proper but also for waters to the north, such as Bellingham Bay and the San Juan Islands region.

The term "Puget Sound" is used not just for the body of water but also the Puget Sound region centered on the sound. Major cities on the sound include Seattle, Tacoma, Olympia, and Everett. Puget Sound is also the second-largest estuary in the United States, after the Chesapeake Bay in Maryland and Virginia.

== Names ==
In 1792, George Vancouver gave the name "Puget's Sound" to the waters south of the Tacoma Narrows, in honor of Peter Puget, a Huguenot lieutenant accompanying him on the Vancouver Expedition. This name later came to be used for the waters north of Tacoma Narrows as well.

An alternative term for Puget Sound, used by a number of Native Americans and environmental groups, is Whulge (or Whulj), an anglicization of the Lushootseed name for Puget Sound, x̌ʷəlč, which literally means "sea, salt water, ocean, or sound". The name for the Lushootseed language, dxʷləšucid, is derived from the root word √ləš, an alternative name for Puget Sound.

== Definitions ==
The United States Geological Survey (USGS) defines Puget Sound as all the waters south of three entrances from the Strait of Juan de Fuca. The main entrance at Admiralty Inlet is defined as a line between Point Wilson on the Olympic Peninsula, and Point Partridge on Whidbey Island. The second entrance is at Deception Pass along a line from West Point on Whidbey Island, to Deception Island, then to Rosario Head on Fidalgo Island. The third entrance is at the south end of the Swinomish Channel, which connects Skagit Bay and Padilla Bay. Under this definition, Puget Sound includes the waters of Hood Canal, Admiralty Inlet, Possession Sound, Saratoga Passage, and others. It does not include Bellingham Bay, Padilla Bay, the waters of the San Juan Islands or anything farther north.

Another definition, given by NOAA, subdivides Puget Sound into five basins or regions. Four of these (including South Puget Sound) correspond to areas within the USGS definition, but the fifth, called Northern Puget Sound, includes a large additional region. It is defined as bounded to the north by the international boundary with Canada, and to the west by a line running north from the mouth of the Sekiu River on the Olympic Peninsula. Under this definition, significant parts of the Strait of Juan de Fuca and the Strait of Georgia are included in Puget Sound, with the international boundary marking an abrupt and hydrologically arbitrary limit.

According to Arthur Kruckeberg, the term Puget Sound is sometimes used for waters north of Admiralty Inlet and Deception Pass, especially for areas along the north coast of Washington and the San Juan Islands, essentially equivalent to NOAA's "Northern Puget Sound" subdivision described above. Kruckeberg uses the term "Puget Sound and adjacent waters". Kruckeberg's 1991 text, however, does not reflect the 2009 decision of the United States Board on Geographic Names to use the term Salish Sea to refer to the greater maritime environment.

== Geology ==
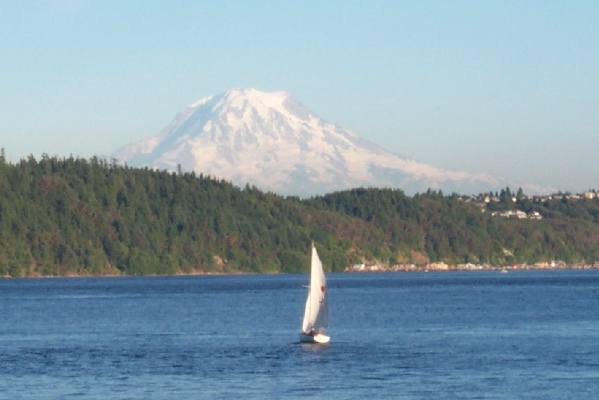
Snow-capped peaks are a backdrop to many Puget Sound scenes; here Mount Rainier is seen from Gig Harbor.

Continental ice sheets have repeatedly advanced and retreated from the Puget Sound region. The most recent glacial period, called the Fraser Glaciation, had three phases, or stades. During the third, or Vashon Glaciation, a lobe of the Cordilleran Ice Sheet, called the Puget Lobe, spread south about 15,000 years ago, covering the Puget Sound region with an ice sheet about 3,000 feet (910 m) thick near Seattle, and nearly 6,000 feet (1,800 m) at the present Canada-U.S. border. Since each new advance and retreat of ice erodes away much of the evidence of previous ice ages, the most recent Vashon phase has left the clearest imprint on the land. At its maximum extent the Vashon ice sheet extended south of Olympia to near Tenino, and covered the lowlands between the Olympic and Cascade mountain ranges. About 14,000 years ago the ice began to retreat. By 11,000 years ago it survived only north of the Canada–US border.

The melting retreat of the Vashon Glaciation eroded the land, creating a drumlin field of hundreds of aligned drumlin hills. Lake Washington and Lake Sammamish (which are ribbon lakes), Hood Canal, and the main Puget Sound basin were altered by glacial forces. These glacial forces are not specifically "carving", as in cutting into the landscape via the mechanics of ice/glaciers, but rather eroding the landscape from melt water of the Vashon Glacier creating the drumlin field. As the ice retreated, vast amounts of glacial till were deposited throughout the Puget Sound region. The soils of the region, less than ten thousand years old, are still characterized as immature.

As the Vashon glacier receded a series of proglacial lakes formed, filling the main trough of Puget Sound and inundating the southern lowlands. Glacial Lake Russell was the first such large recessional lake. From the vicinity of Seattle in the north the lake extended south to the Black Hills, where it drained south into the Chehalis River. Sediments from Lake Russell form the blue-gray clay identified as the Lawton Clay. The second major recessional lake was Glacial Lake Bretz. It also drained to the Chehalis River until the Chimacum Valley, in the northeast Olympic Peninsula, melted, allowing the lake's water to rapidly drain north into the marine waters of the Strait of Juan de Fuca, which was rising as the ice sheet retreated.

As icebergs calved off the toe of the glacier, their embedded gravels and boulders were deposited in the chaotic mix of unsorted till geologists call glaciomarine drift. Many beaches about the Sound display glacial erratics, rendered more prominent than those in coastal woodland solely by their exposed position; submerged glacial erratics sometimes cause hazards to navigation. The sheer weight of glacial-age ice depressed the landforms, which experienced post-glacial rebound after the ice sheets had retreated. Because the rate of rebound was not synchronous with the post-ice age rise in sea levels, the bed of what is now Puget Sound filled alternately with fresh and with sea water. The upper level of the lake-sediment Lawton Clay now lies about 120 feet (37 m) above sea level.

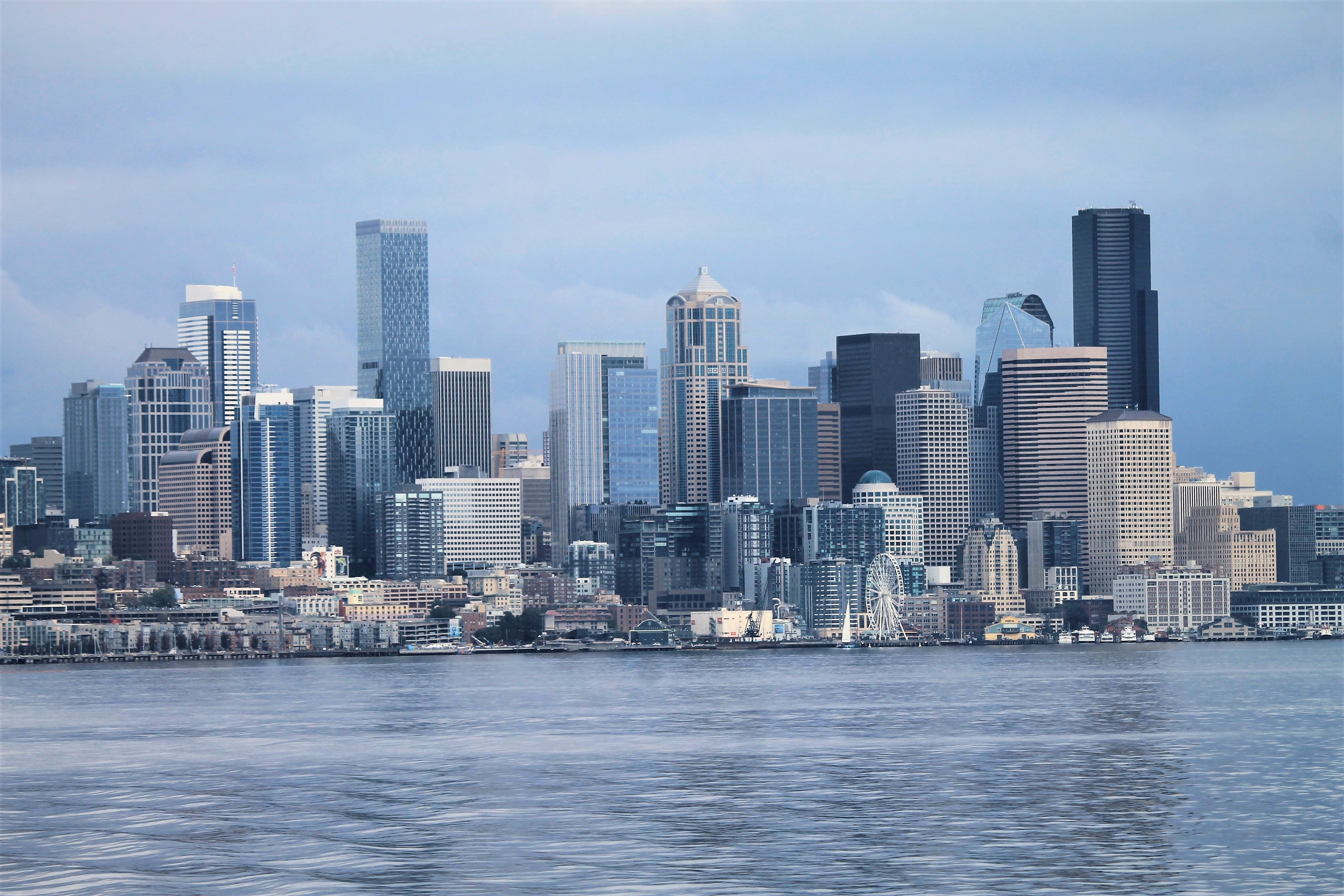
The Downtown Seattle skyline, seen from a state ferry on Elliott Bay

The Puget Sound system consists of four deep basins connected by shallower sills. The four basins are Hood Canal, west of the Kitsap Peninsula, Whidbey Basin, east of Whidbey Island, South Sound, south of the Tacoma Narrows, and the Main Basin, which is further subdivided into Admiralty Inlet and the Central Basin. Puget Sound's sills, a kind of submarine terminal moraine, separate the basins from one another, and Puget Sound from the Strait of Juan de Fuca. Three sills are particularly significant—the one at Admiralty Inlet which checks the flow of water between the Strait of Juan de Fuca and Puget Sound, the one at the entrance to Hood Canal (about 175 ft or 53 m below the surface), and the one at the Tacoma Narrows (about 145 ft or 44 m). Other sills that present less of a barrier include the ones at Blake Island, Agate Pass, Rich Passage, and Hammersley Inlet.

The depth of the basins is a result of the Sound being part of the Cascadia subduction zone, where the terranes accreted at the edge of the Juan de Fuca Plate are being subducted under the North American Plate. There has not been a major subduction zone earthquake here since the magnitude nine Cascadia earthquake; according to Japanese records, it occurred on January 26, 1700. Lesser Puget Sound earthquakes with shallow epicenters, caused by the fracturing of stressed oceanic rocks as they are subducted, still cause great damage. The Seattle Fault cuts across Puget Sound, crossing the southern tip of Bainbridge Island and under Elliott Bay. To the south, the existence of a second fault, the Tacoma Fault, has buckled the intervening strata in the Seattle Uplift.

Typical Puget Sound profiles of dense glacial till overlying permeable glacial outwash of gravels above an impermeable bed of silty clay may become unstable after periods of unusually wet weather and slump in landslides.

== Hydrology ==
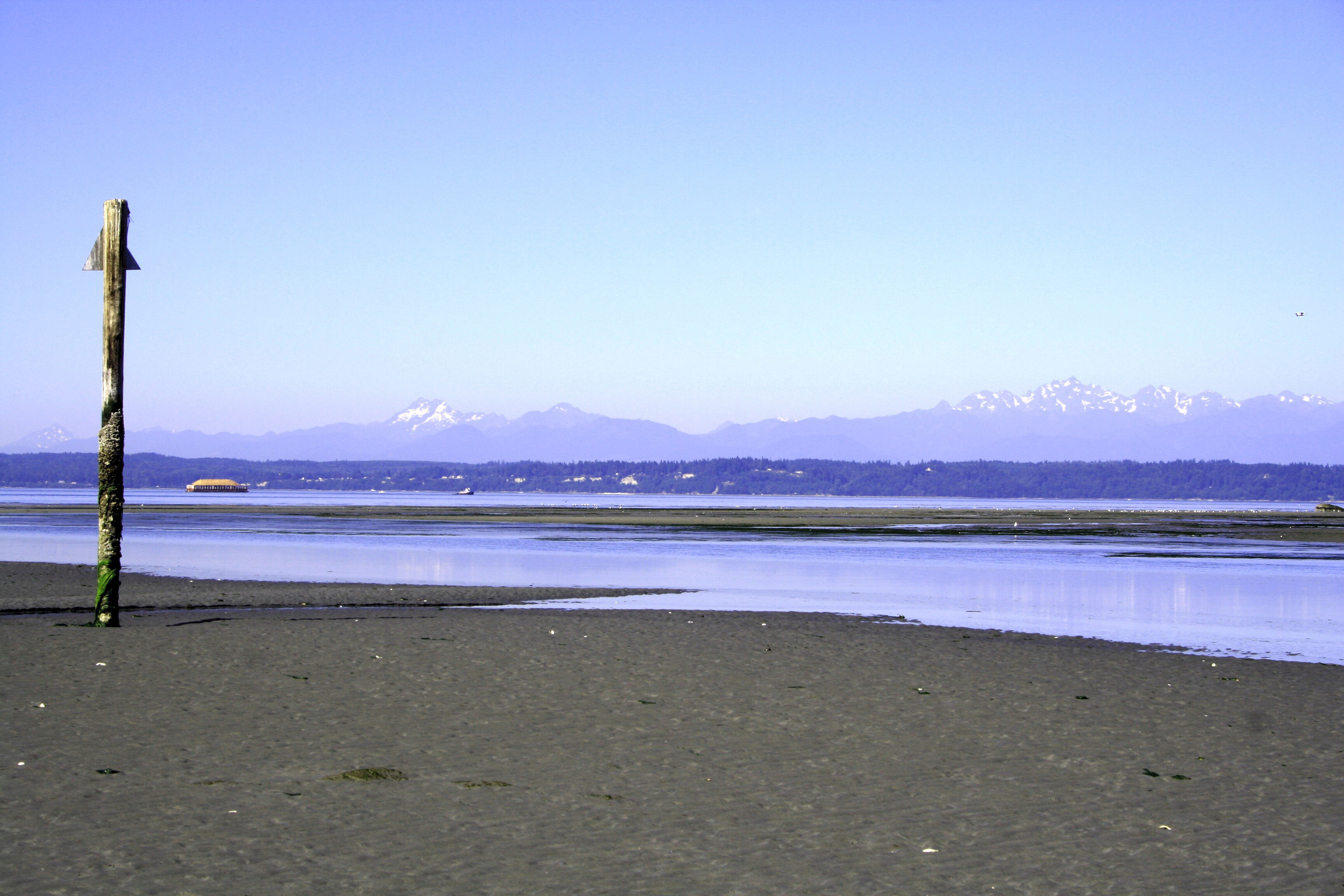
Low tide on Whidbey Island

The United States Geological Survey (USGS) defines Puget Sound as a bay with numerous channels and branches; more specifically, it is a fjord system of flooded glacial valleys. Puget Sound is part of a larger physiographic structure termed the Puget Trough, which is a physiographic section of the larger Pacific Border province, which in turn is part of the larger Pacific Mountain System.

Puget Sound is a large salt water estuary, or system of many estuaries, fed by highly seasonal freshwater from the Olympic and Cascade Mountain watersheds. The mean annual river discharge into Puget Sound is 41,000 cubic feet per second (1,200 m^{3}/s), with a monthly average maximum of about 367,000 cubic feet per second (10,400 m^{3}/s) and minimum of about 14,000 cubic feet per second (400 m^{3}/s). Puget Sound's shoreline is 1,332 miles (2,144 km) long, encompassing a water area of 1,020 square miles (2,600 km^{2}) and a total volume of 26.5 cubic miles (110 km^{3}) at mean high water. The average volume of water flowing in and out of Puget Sound during each tide is 1.26 cubic miles (5.3 km^{3}). The maximum tidal currents, in the range of 9 to 10 knots, occurs at Deception Pass. Water flow through Deception Pass is approximately equal to 2% of the total tidal exchange between Puget Sound and the Strait of Juan de Fuca.

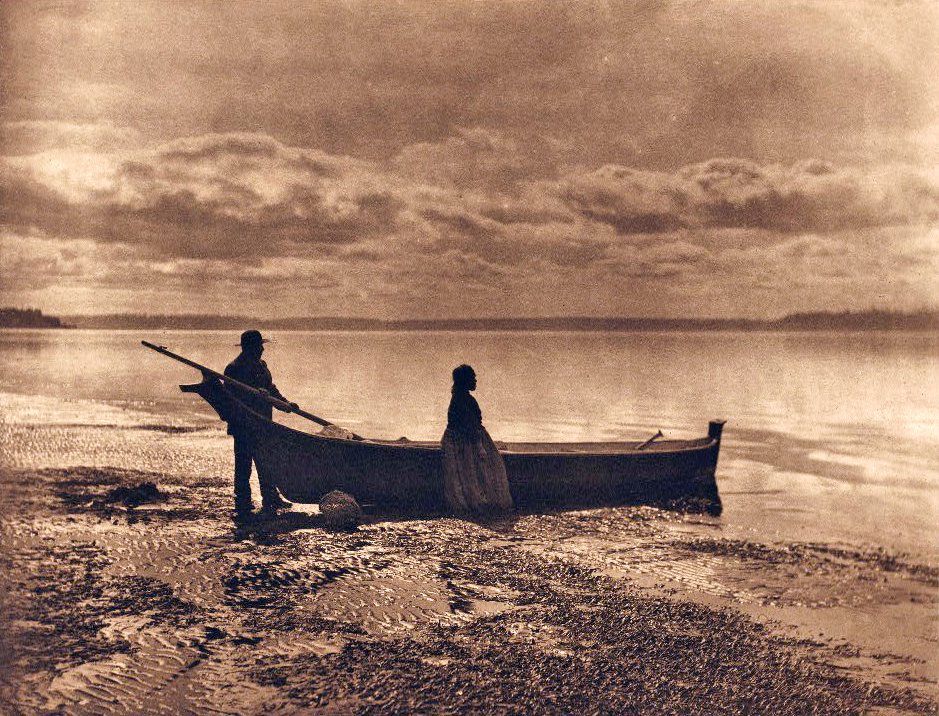
Evening on Puget Sound by Edward S. Curtis, 1913

The size of Puget Sound's watershed is 12,138 sq mi (31,440 km^{2}). "Northern Puget Sound" is frequently considered part of the Puget Sound watershed, which enlarges its size to 13,700 sq mi (35,000 km^{2}). The USGS uses the name Puget Sound for its hydrologic unit subregion 1711, which includes areas draining to Puget Sound proper as well as the Strait of Juan de Fuca, the Strait of Georgia, and the Fraser River. Significant rivers that drain to "Northern Puget Sound" include the Nooksack, Dungeness, and Elwha Rivers. The Nooksack empties into Bellingham Bay, the Dungeness and Elwha into the Strait of Juan de Fuca. The Chilliwack River flows north to the Fraser River in Canada.

Tides in Puget Sound are of the mixed type with two high and two low tides each tidal day. These are called Higher High Water (HHW), Lower Low Water (LLW), Lower High Water (LHW), and Higher Low Water (HLW). The configuration of basins, sills, and interconnections cause the tidal range to increase within Puget Sound. The difference in height between the Higher High Water and the Lower Low Water averages about 8.3 feet (2.5 m) at Port Townsend on Admiralty Inlet, but increases to about 14.4 feet (4.4 m) at Olympia, the southern end of Puget Sound. The tidal range is also seasonal: it peaks in winter, with December averaging 3.95 m compared with 3.27 m in March.

Puget Sound is generally accepted as the start of the Inside Passage.

== Flora and fauna ==
Important marine flora of Puget Sound include eelgrass (Zostera marina) and various kelp, important kelps include canopy forming bull kelp (Nereocystis luetkeana). and edible kelps like kombu (Saccharina latissima)

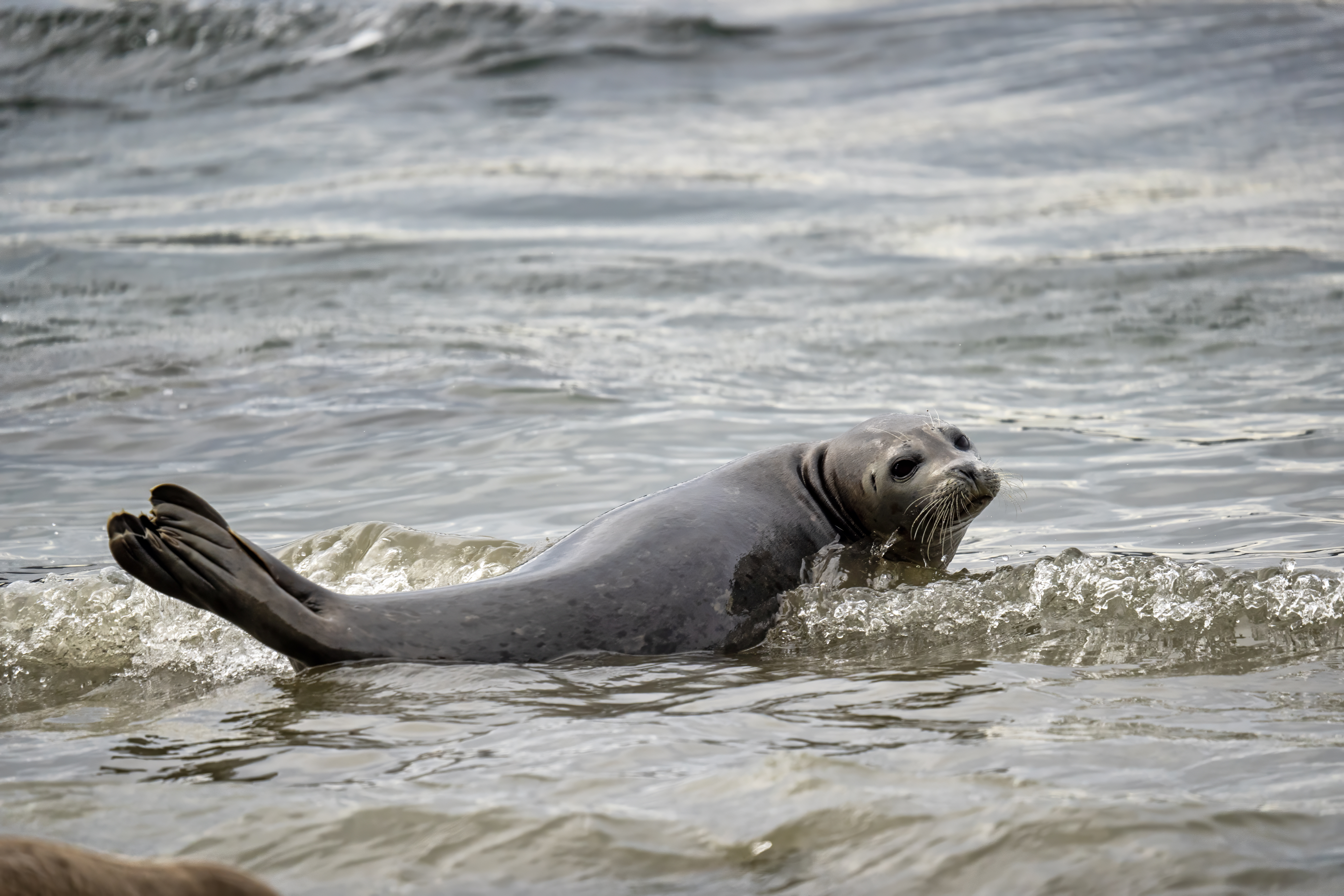
A harbor seal along the coast of the Puget Sound

Among the marine mammals species found in Puget Sound are harbor seals (Phoca vitulina). Orca (Orcinus orca), or "killer whales" are famous throughout the Sound, and are a large tourist attraction. Although orca are sometimes seen in Puget Sound proper they are far more prevalent around the San Juan Islands north of Puget Sound.

Many fish species occur in Puget Sound. The various salmonid species, including salmon, trout, and char are particularly well-known and studied. Salmonid species of Puget Sound include chinook salmon (Oncorhynchus tshawytscha), chum salmon (O. keta), coho salmon (O. kisutch), pink salmon (O. gorbuscha), sockeye salmon (O. nerka), sea-run coastal cutthroat trout (O. clarki clarki), steelhead (O. mykiss irideus), sea-run bull trout (Salvelinus confluentus), and Dolly Varden trout (Salvelinus malma malma).

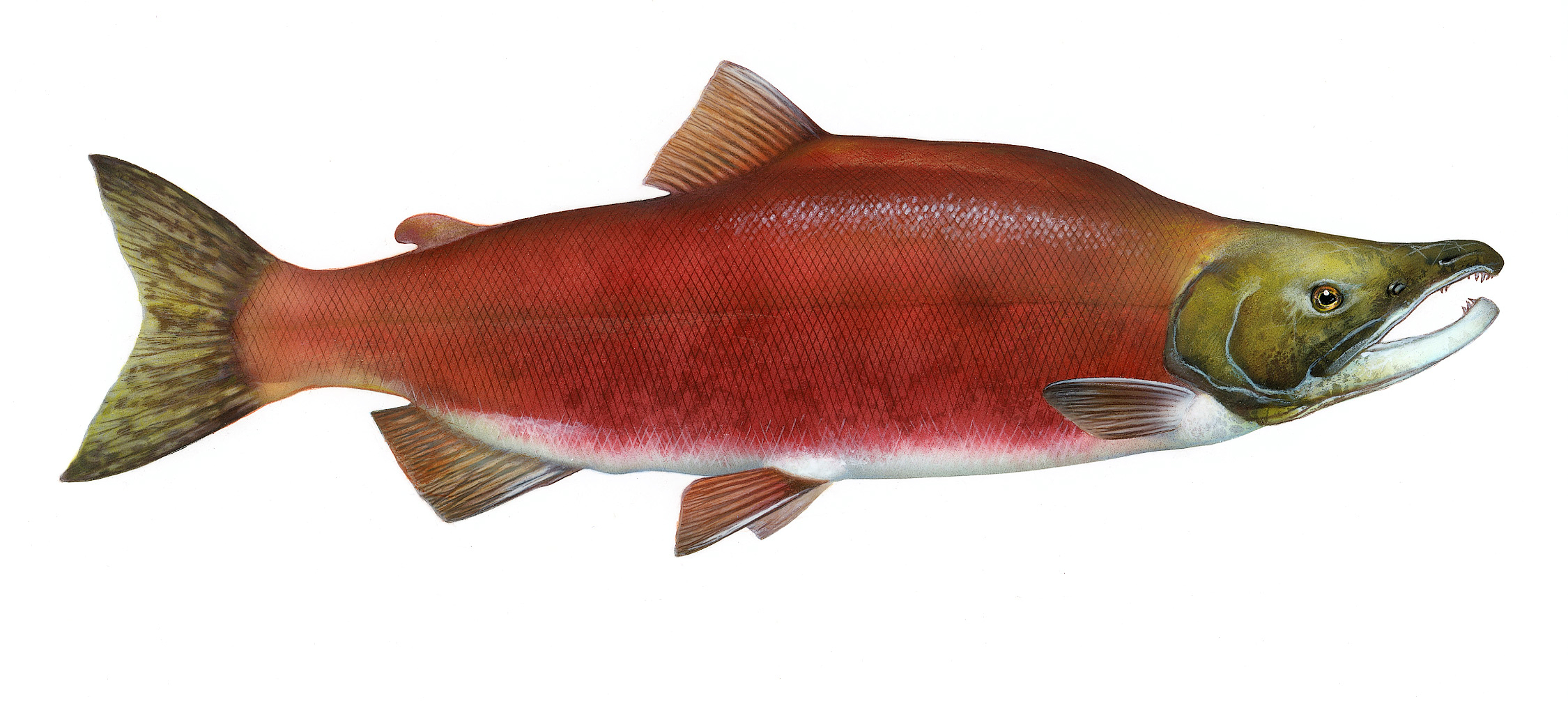
Sockeye salmon (Oncorhynchus nerka) with spawning colors

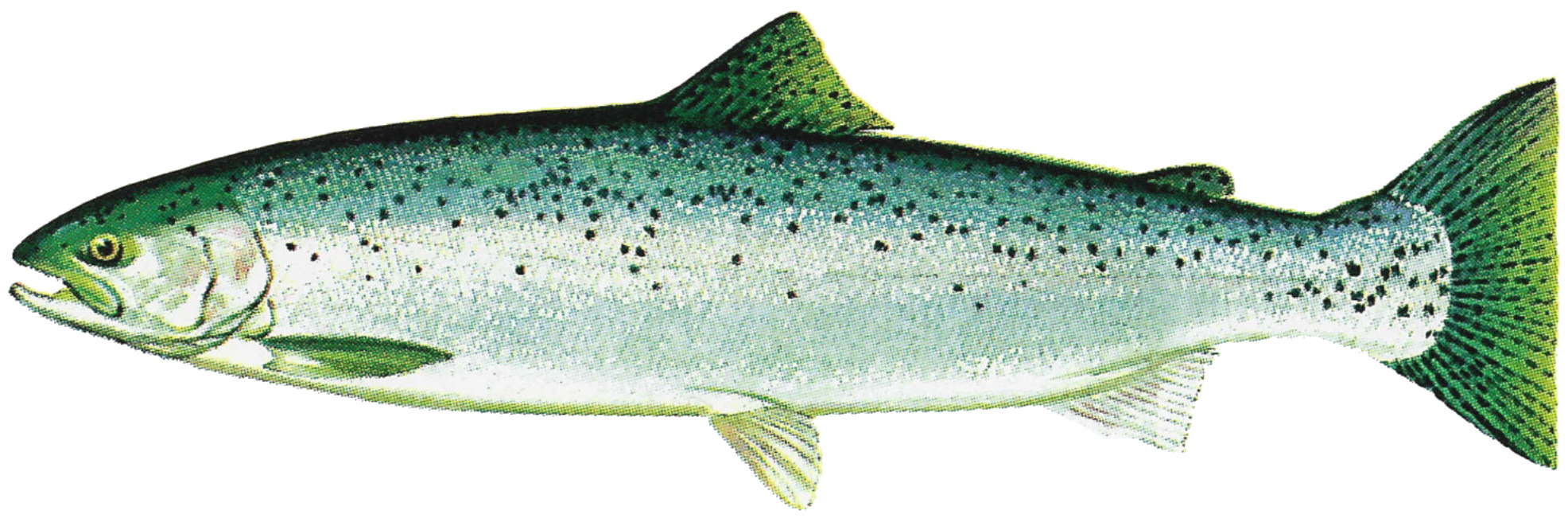
Steelhead trout (Oncorhynchus mykiss)

Common forage fishes found in Puget Sound include Pacific herring (Clupea pallasii), surf smelt (Hypomesus pretiosus), and Pacific sand lance (Ammodytes hexapterus). Important benthopelagic fish of Puget Sound include North Pacific hake (Merluccius productus), Pacific cod (Gadus macrocephalus), walleye/Alaska pollock (Theragra chalcogramma), and the spiny dogfish (Squalus acanthias). Lots of other notable groundfish exist in Puget Sound, such the lingcod (Ophiodon elongatus) and other greenlings, cabezon (Scorpaenichthys marmoratus) and other sculpins, and the Pacific halibut (Hippoglossus stenolepis) along with other flatfish such as the California halibut (Paralichthys californicus,) soles, and sanddabs.

There are about 28 species of Sebastidae (rockfish), of many types, found in Puget Sound. Among those of special interest are copper rockfish (Sebastes caurinus), quillback rockfish (S. maliger), black rockfish (S. melanops), yelloweye rockfish (S. ruberrimus), bocaccio rockfish (S. paucispinis), canary rockfish (S. pinniger), and Puget Sound rockfish (S. emphaeus). Interestingly, hybridization has occurred between some of these rockfish, in the case of between the quillback, copper, and brown (S. auriculatus.) Some rockfish, like the bocaccio and vermillion (S. miniatus,) have a distinct population segment in the sound, which are at risk of overfishing.

Many other fish species occur in Puget Sound, such as sturgeons, lampreys, and various cartilaginous like fish sharks, chimeras, rays, and skates.

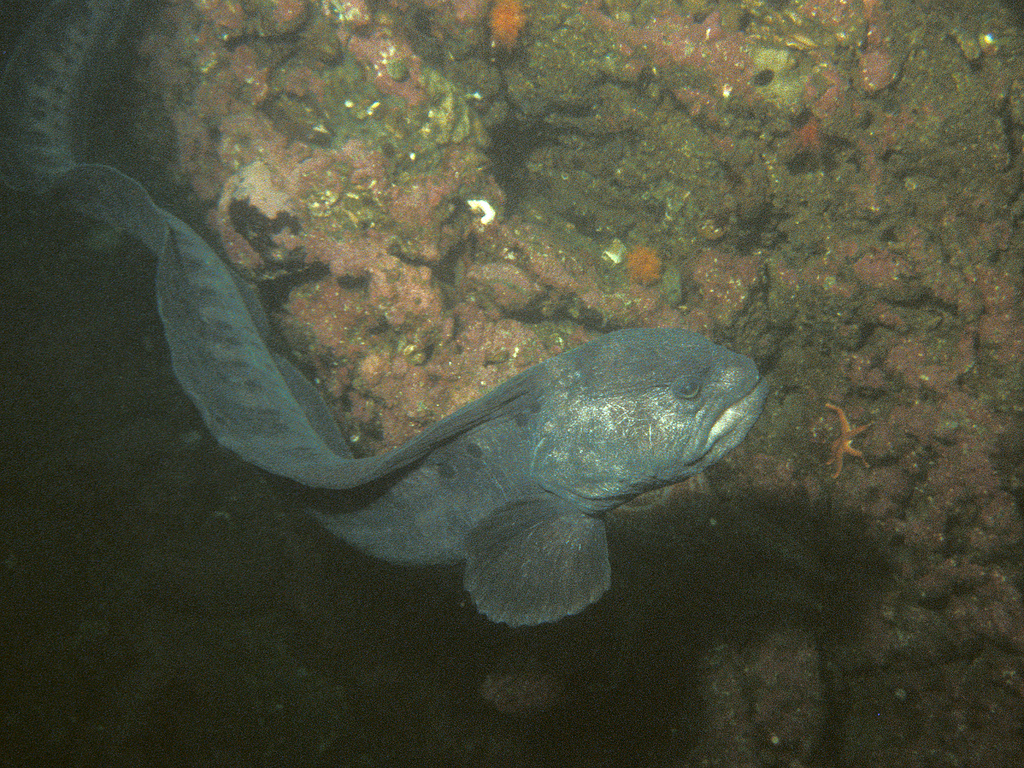
A wolf eel (Anarrhichthys ocellatus) in Puget Sound

Puget Sound is home to numerous species of marine invertebrates, including sponges, sea anemones, chitons, clams, sea snails, limpets, crabs, barnacles, starfish, sea urchins, and sand dollars. Dungeness crabs (Metacarcinus magister) occur throughout Washington waters, including Puget Sound. Many bivalves occur in Puget Sound, such as Pacific oysters (Crassostrea gigas) and geoduck clams (Panopea generosa). The Olympia oyster (Ostrea lurida), once common in Puget Sound, was depleted by human activities during the 20th century. There are ongoing efforts to restore Olympia oysters in Puget Sound.

In 1967, an initial scuba survey estimated that were "about 110 million pounds of geoducks" (pronounced "gooey ducks") situated in Puget Sound's sediments. Also known as "king clam", geoducks are considered to be a delicacy in Asian countries.

There are many seabird species in Puget Sound. Among these are grebes such as the western grebe (Aechmophorus occidentalis); loons such as the common loon (Gavia immer); auks such as the pigeon guillemot (Cepphus columba), rhinoceros auklet (Cerorhinca monocerata), common murre (Uria aalge), and marbled murrelet (Brachyramphus marmoratus); the brant goose (Branta bernicla); sea ducks such as the long-tailed duck (Clangula hyemalis), harlequin duck (Histrionicus histrionicus), and surf scoter (Melanitta perspicillata); and cormorants such as the double-crested cormorant (Phalacrocorax auritus). Puget Sound is home to a non-migratory and marine-oriented subspecies of great blue herons (Ardea herodias fannini). Bald eagles (Haliaeetus leucocephalus) occur in relative high densities in the Puget Sound region.

== History ==
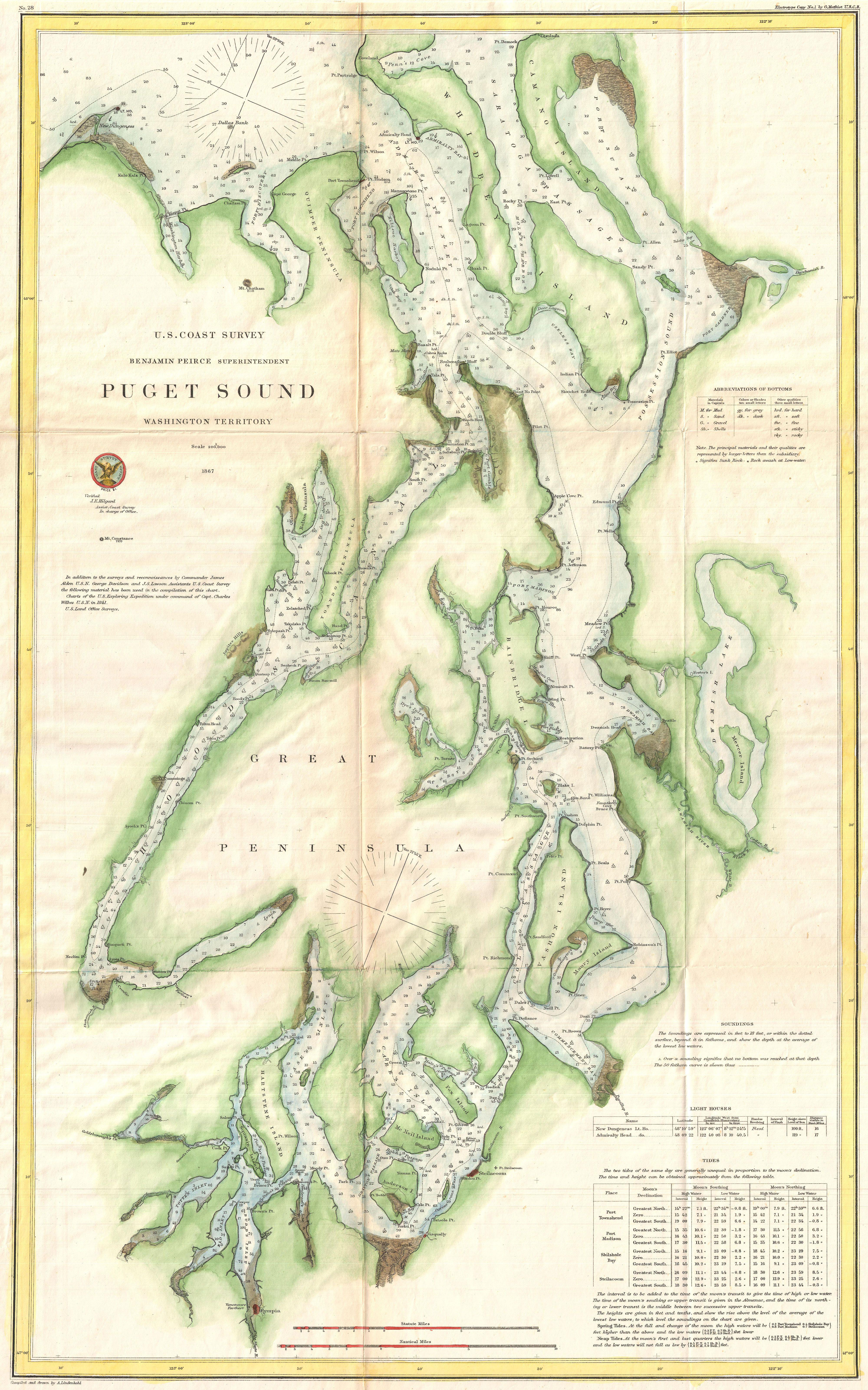
U.S. Coast Survey nautical chart of Puget Sound, Washington Territory, 1867

Puget Sound has been home to many Indigenous peoples, such as the Lushootseed-speaking peoples, as well as the Twana, Chimakum, and Klallam, for millennia. The earliest known presence of Indigenous inhabitants in the Puget Sound region is between 14,000 BCE to 6,000 BCE.

Puget Sound's location in the U.S.

Dispatched in an attempt to locate the fabled Northwest Passage, British Royal Navy captain George Vancouver anchored on May 19, 1792, on the shores of Seattle, explored Puget Sound, and claimed it for Great Britain on June 4 the same year, naming it for one of his officers, Lieutenant Peter Puget. He further named the entire region; New Georgia, after King George III. After 1818 Britain and the United States, which both claimed the Oregon Country, agreed to "joint occupancy", deferring resolution of the Oregon boundary dispute. The Puget Sound Agricultural Company was formed by the Hudson's Bay Company to encourage settlement. Pursuant to the 1846 Oregon Treaty; Puget Sound which was part of the disputed region became US territory.

American maritime fur traders visited Puget Sound in the early 19th century.

An Hudson's Bay Company expedition led by James McMillan in late 1824 was first non-Indigenous group to enter Puget Sound since George Vancouver in 1792. The expedition went on to reach the Fraser River, first again to reach the lower Fraser since Fraser himself in 1808.

The first non-Indigenous settlement in the Puget Sound area was Fort Nisqually, a fur trade post of the Hudson's Bay Company (HBC) built in 1833. Fort Nisqually was part of the HBC's Columbia District, headquartered at Fort Vancouver. In 1838, the HBC's subsidy operation, the Puget Sound Agricultural Company was established in part to procure resources and trade, as well as to further establish British claim to the region. Missionaries J.P. Richmond and W.H. Wilson were attending Fort Nisqually for two years by 1840. British ships, such as the Beaver, exported foodstuffs and provisions from Fort Nisqually, and would eventually export Puget Sound lumber, an industry that would soon outpace the dominant fur trading market and drive the early Puget Sound economy.

The first organized American expedition took place under the helm of Commander Charles Wilkes, whose exploring party sailed up Puget Sound in 1841. The first permanent American settlement on Puget Sound was Tumwater, founded in 1845 by Americans who had come via the Oregon Trail. The decision to settle north of the Columbia River was made in part because one of the settlers, George Washington Bush, was considered black and the Provisional Government of Oregon banned the residency of mulattoes but did not actively enforce the restriction north of the river. In 1853 Washington Territory was formed from part of Oregon Territory. In 1888 the Northern Pacific railroad line reached Puget Sound, linking the region to eastern states. Washington State was admitted to the union in 1889 as part of the Enabling Act, and the regions borders have since remained unchanged.

== Transportation ==
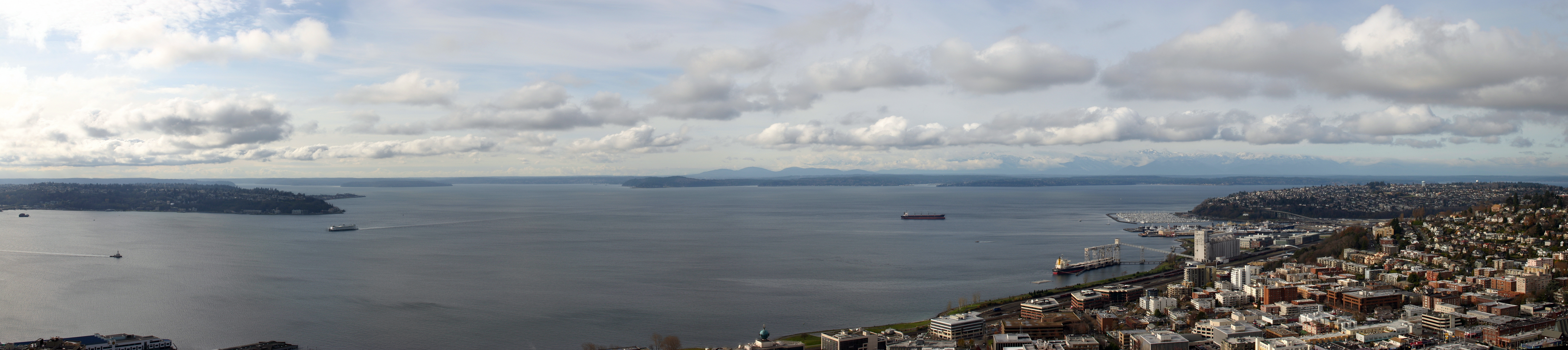
View northwest from the Space Needle, overlooking (left to right) Elliott Bay, Duwamish Head, Puget Sound, and Restoration Point

The Washington State Ferries (WSF) are a state-run ferry system that connects the larger islands of Puget Sound the Washington mainland, and the Olympic and Kitsap Peninsulas. Its vessels carry both passengers and vehicular traffic. The system averaged 24.3 million passengers in the 2010s and 17.2 in 2022 with the COVID-19 pandemic. It is the largest ferry operator in the United States.

== Environmental issues ==
Over the past 30 years, as the region's human population has increased, there has been a correlating decrease in various plant and animal species which inhabit Puget Sound. The decline has been seen in numerous populations including forage fish, salmonids, bottom fish, marine birds, harbor porpoise, and orcas. The decline is attributed to various issues, including human population growth, pollution, and climate change. Because of this population decline, there have been changes to the fishery practices, and an increase in petitioning to add species to the Endangered Species Act. There has also been an increase in recovery and management plans for many different area species.

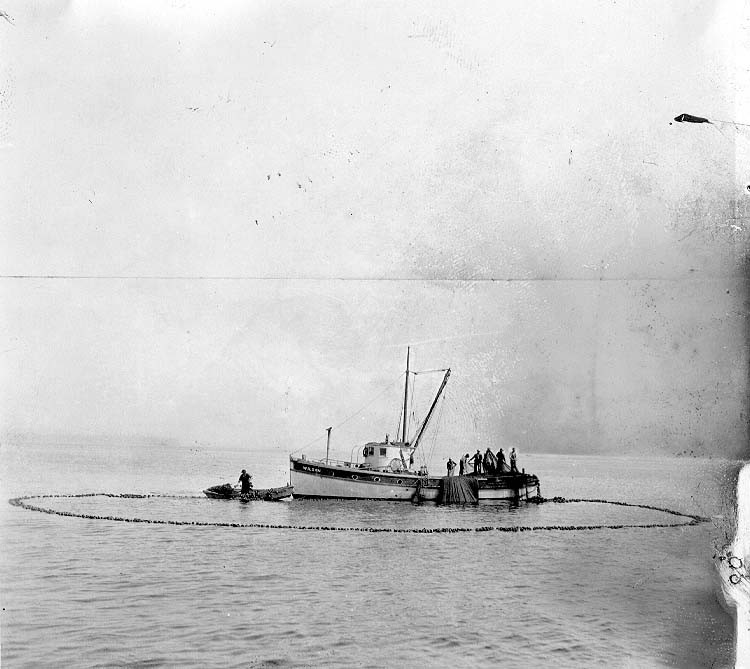
Purse seining on Puget Sound c. 1917

The causes of these environmental issues are toxic contamination, eutrophication (low oxygen due to excess nutrients), and near shore habitat changes. The Washington Department of Fisheries began an artificial reef construction program in 1975 to create habitats in Puget Sound for declining fish populations, particularly rockfish and lingcod. Some reefs used disposed vehicle tires, tied together with polypropylene rope, until they were phased out in 1982 in favor of less-expensive scrap concrete. The degraded rope allowed disposed tires to create obstructions that damage habitats and harm Puget Sound wildlife; the state government began removing the tire piles in late 2024 at Tolmie State Park. An estimated 100,000 tires remain in Puget Sound at 14 identified sites.

On May 22, 1978, a valve was mistakenly opened aboard the submarine USS Puffer, releasing up to 500 US gallons (1,900 L; 420 imp gal) of radioactive water into Puget Sound, during an overhaul in drydock at Bremerton Naval Shipyard.

== See also ==
- Back-arc basin – Submarine features associated with island arcs and subduction zones
- Fjords of Canada
- Fjords of the United States
- Puget Sound AVA – Viticultural area in Washington, USA
- Seattle metropolitan area
