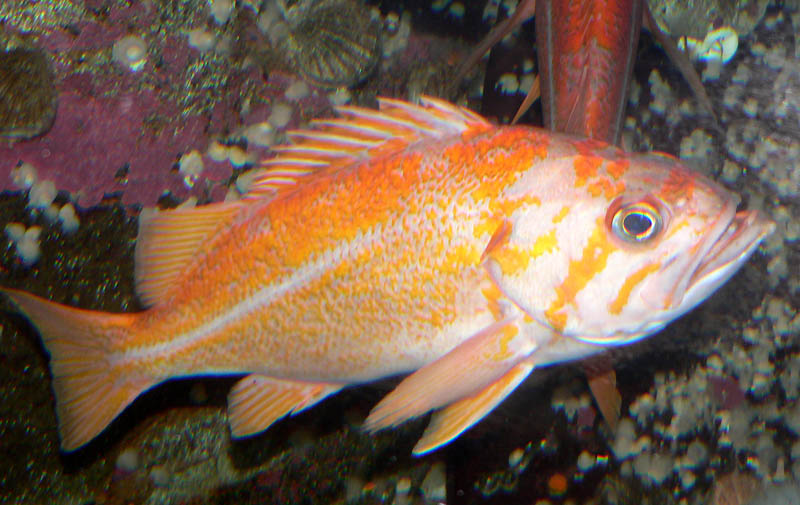
- At the Vancouver Aquarium

Scientific classification
- Kingdom: Animalia
- Phylum: Chordata
- Class: Actinopterygii
- Order: Perciformes
- Family: Scorpaenidae
- Genus: Sebastes
- Species: S. pinniger

Binomial name
- Sebastes pinniger (Gill, 1864)

Synonyms
- Sebastosomus pinniger Gill, 1864; Sebastichthys pinniger (Gill, 1864); Sebastodes pinniger (Gill, 1864)

= Canary rockfish =

Species of fish

The canary rockfish (Sebastes pinniger), also known as the orange rockfish, is a species of marine ray-finned fish belonging to the subfamily Sebastinae, the rockfishes, part of the family Scorpaenidae. It is native to the waters of the Pacific Ocean off western North America.

== Taxonomy ==
The canary rockfish was first formally described in 1864 by the American zoologist Theodore Gill with the type locality given as California. Some authorities place this species in the subgenus Rosicola. The specific name pinniger is a compound of pinnis which means "fin" and iger meaning "to bear" thought to be a reference to the longer pectoral and ventral fins of this species in comparison to the similar S. rosaceus.

== Description ==
As the name suggests, this rockfish is notable for a general orange-yellow appearance, consisting of a blotchy orange pattern over a whitish or light gray background. The head has three stripes angling downwards and back, the middle one generally running across the eye, and the other two on each side of the eye. The lateral line is within a narrow stripe clear of blotches. The fins are orange, with the pectoral, pelvic, and anal fins somewhat pointed and larger (thus the species epithet pinniger, meaning "I bear a large fin"). Some individuals have dark blotches on the body or dorsal fin. Maximum recorded length is 76 cm (29.6 in).

== Ecology ==
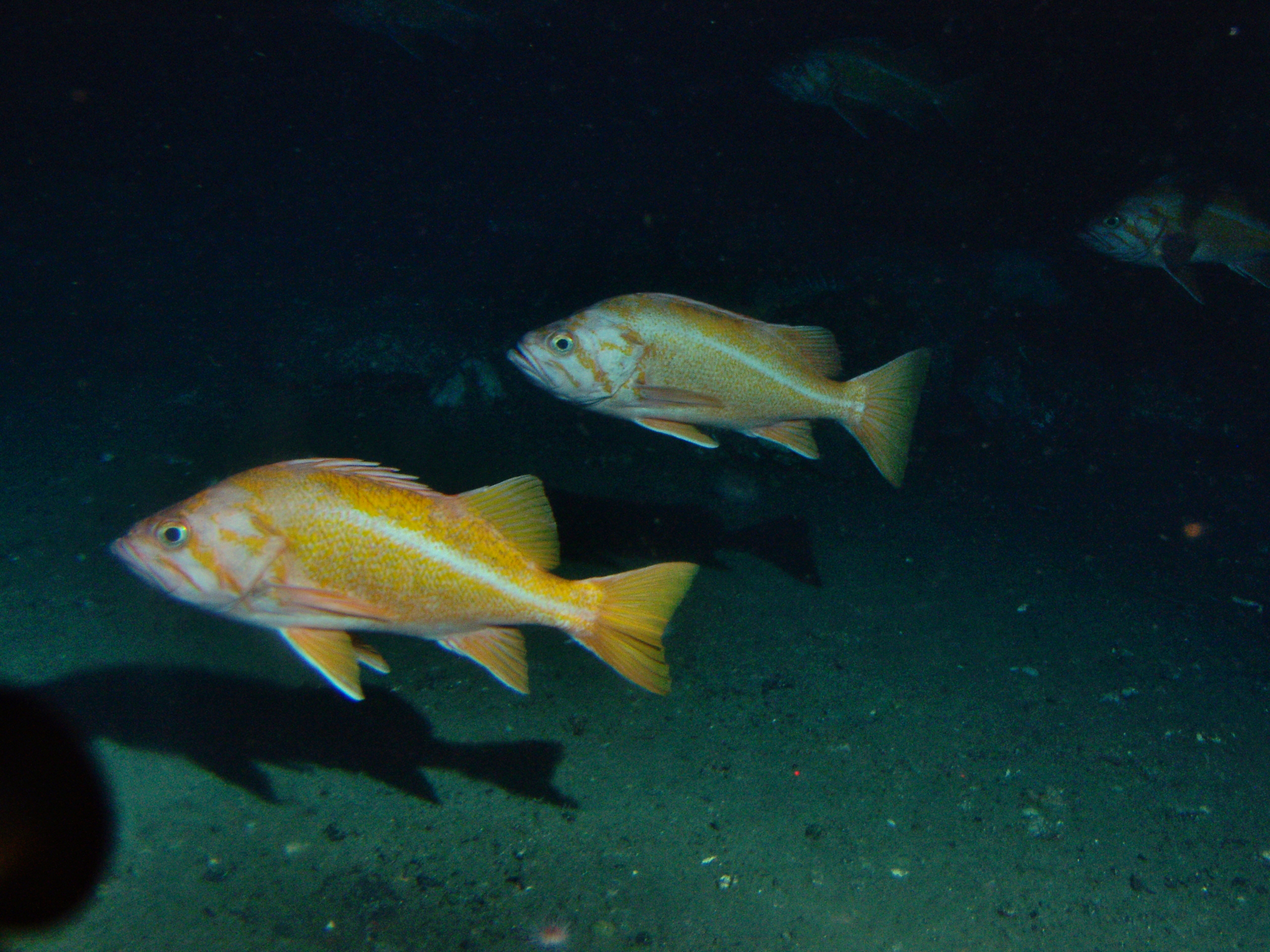
Canary rockfish schooling, in California, at a depth of 175 meters.

Young canaries live in relatively shallow water, moving to deeper water as they mature. Adults are mostly found at depths of 80–200 meters (with two recorded at 838 meters), tending to collect in groups around pinnacles and similar high-relief rock formations, especially where the current is strong. Some off Oregon have been reported living over flat rock and mud-boulder bottoms. They may move considerable distances; one individual covered 700 km in four years after being tagged and released. Juveniles feed on small crustacea such as krill larvae (and eggs), copepods and amphipods, while adults eat krill and small fishes.

== Conservation ==
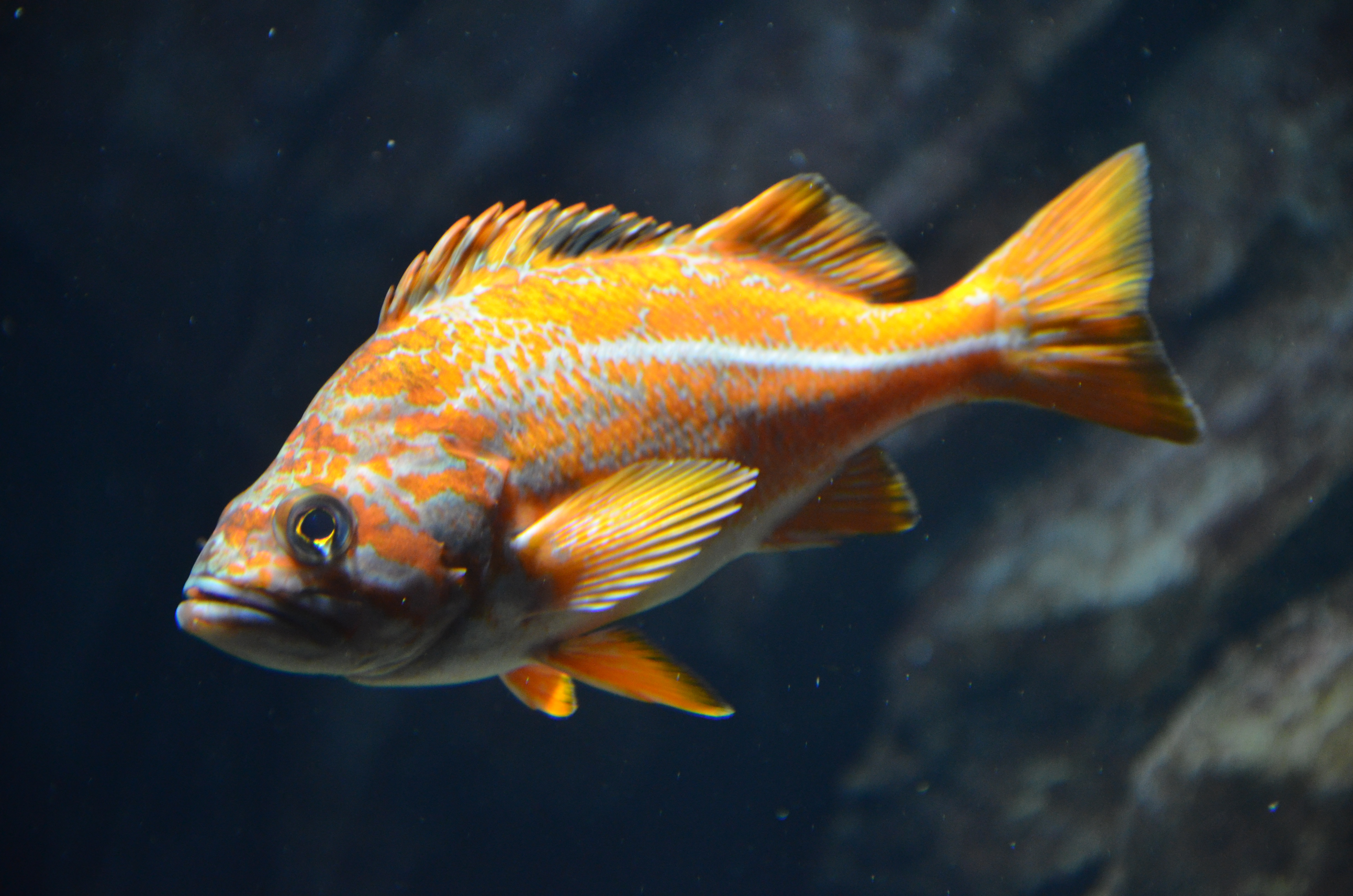
At Ripley's Aquarium

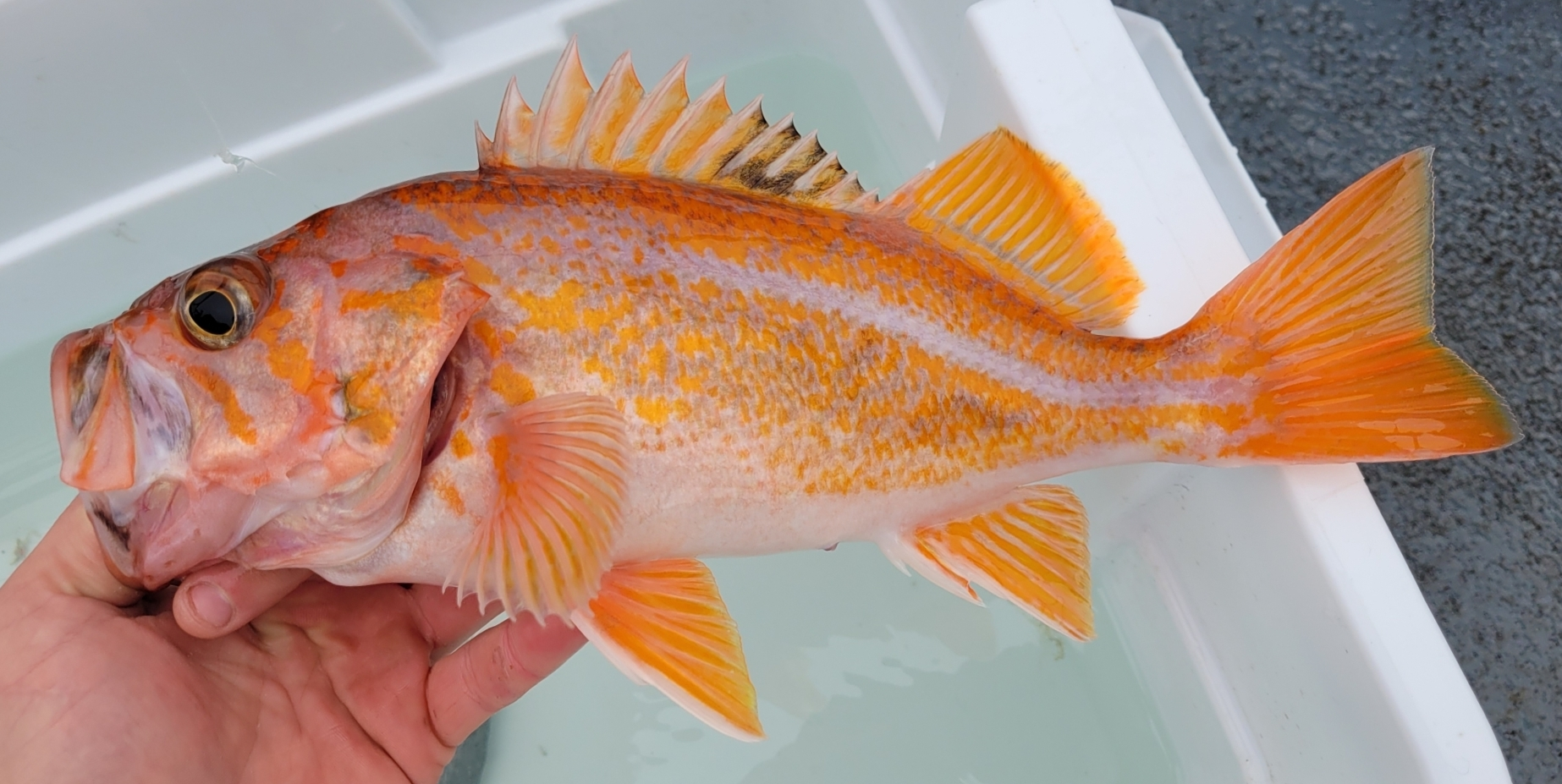
Showing fully extended fins, California

They have been an important commercial species since at least the early 1880s, with fisheries off San Francisco, California and Washington state. They are caught in trawling and hook and line operations, along with a variety of other fish such as yellowtail, lingcod, and other rockfishes. The population on the U.S. West Coast were declared overfished in 2000 and a recovery plan was implemented in 2001. This stock was declared rebuilt in 2015.

In 2007, the National Marine Fisheries Service (NMFS) received a petition to list a distinct population segment (DPS) of canary rockfish, and four other rockfishes, in Puget Sound, as an endangered or threatened species under the Endangered Species Act). (ESA). NMFS found that this petition presented enough information to warrant conducting a status review of the species. Based on the status review NMFS proposed listing this species as threatened in 2009. After a later review that included new genetic analyses, a final listing decision was made in January 2017:

Based on recently obtained new genetic information that indicates that the Puget Sound/Georgia Basin population of canary rockfish is not genetically discrete from canary rockfish on the coast, we published a final rule in January 2017 removing the Puget Sound/Georgia Basin DPS of canary rockfish from the Federal List of Threatened and Endangered Species list. Because of the lack of discreteness in the Puget Sound/Georgia Basin canary rockfish population, we find that it does not meet the DPS criteria and therefore does not qualify for listing under the Endangered Species Act.

=== Survival during catch and release ===
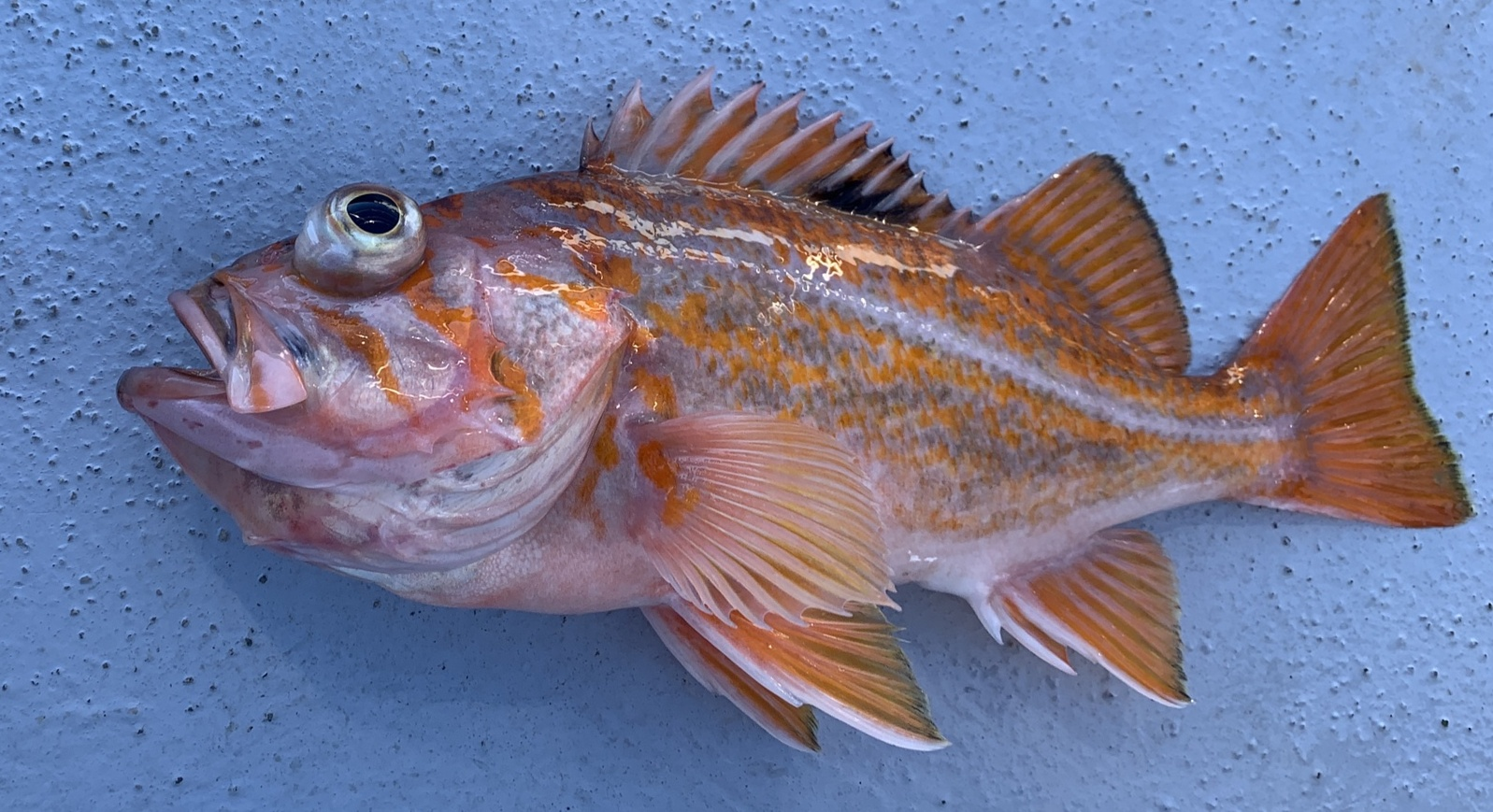
Showing barotrauma after being caught

As with all rockfish (Sebastes sp.), canary rockfish have closed swim bladders. As a result, they often experience various barotrauma related injuries when captured and brought up from great depths, including inflated swim bladders. When released after capture, this causes them to float and eventually die at the ocean surface. However, if the fish are brought back down to the depths from which they came before being released, their body recompresses, giving them a chance at survival.

The post-recompression survival rate of canary rockfish is much lower than that of yelloweye rockfish.

== Nutrition ==
Nutrition information for canary rockfish is as follows.

Serving Size	100g
=== Calories ===	88 kcal
=== Protein ===	19.1 g
Protein calories: 82 kcal Protein calories % : 92.4%	
=== Fat ===	0.7 g
Fat calories: 7 kcal Fat calories % : 7.6%	
=== Carbohydrate ===	0.0 g
Carbohydrate calories: 0 kcal Carbohydrate calories % : 0.0%	
Cholesterol	73.6 mg
Sodium	51.5 mg

Serving Size	per 100g	per 100 kcal
Omega 3 (EPA+DHA)	316 mg	346 mg
Vitamin B3	3.6 mg	3.9 mg
Vitamin B6	0.2 mg	0.2 mg
Vitamin B12	1.9 mcg	2.1 mcg
Vitamin D	84 IU	92 IU
Vitamin E	0 mg	0 mg
Calcium	7.3 mg	8.0 mg
Magnesium	23.3 mg	25.5 mg
Phosphorus	214 mg	234 mg
Potassium	406 mg	445 mg
Selenium	60 mcg	66 mcg
