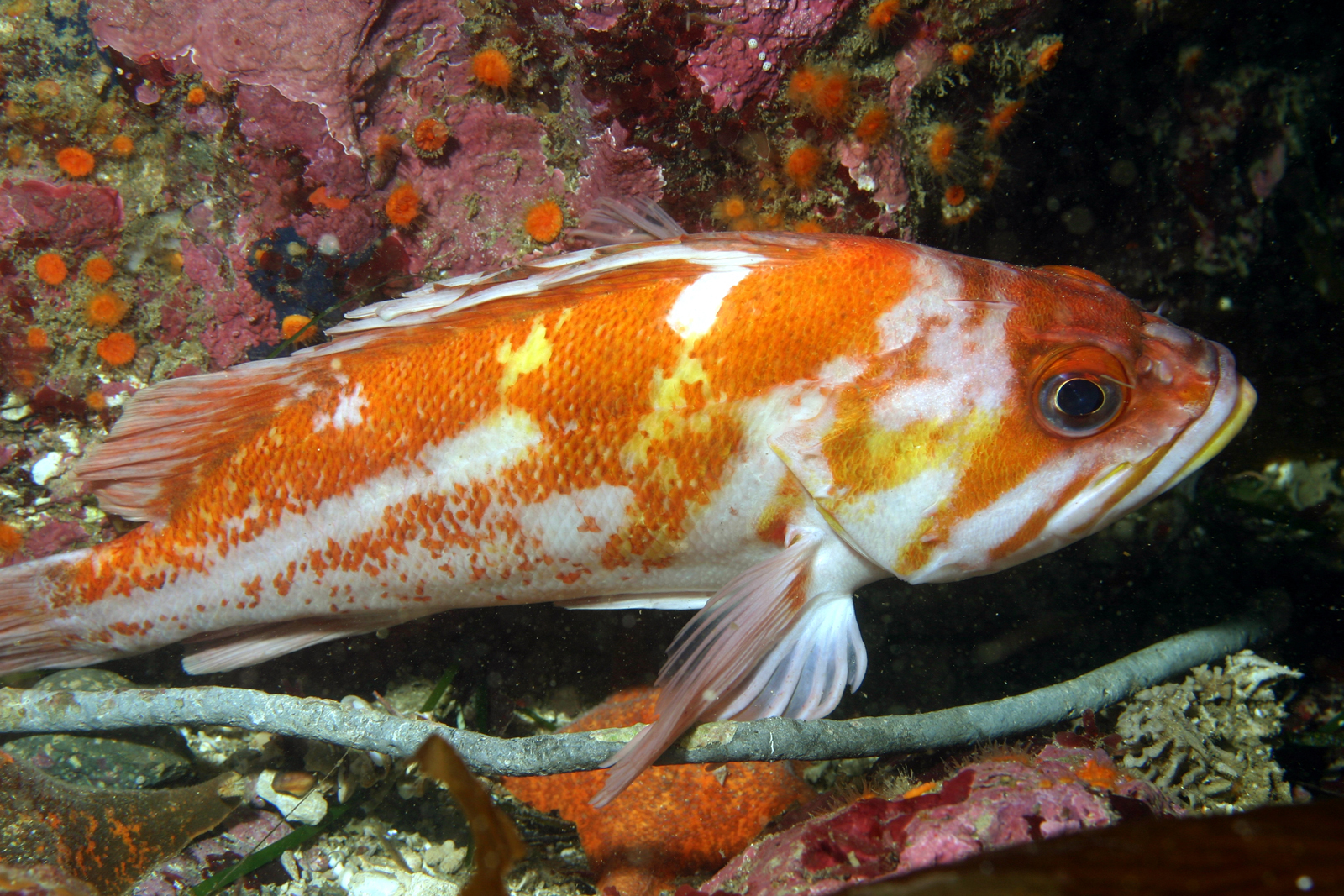

Conservation status
- Near Threatened (IUCN 3.1)

Scientific classification
- Kingdom: Animalia
- Phylum: Chordata
- Class: Actinopterygii
- Division: Teleostei
- Order: Perciformes
- Family: Scorpaenidae
- Genus: Sebastes
- Species: S. caurinus

Binomial name
- Sebastes caurinus J. Richardson, 1844

Synonyms
- Sebastodes caurinus (Richardson, 1844); Sebastes vexillaris

= Copper rockfish =

Species of fish

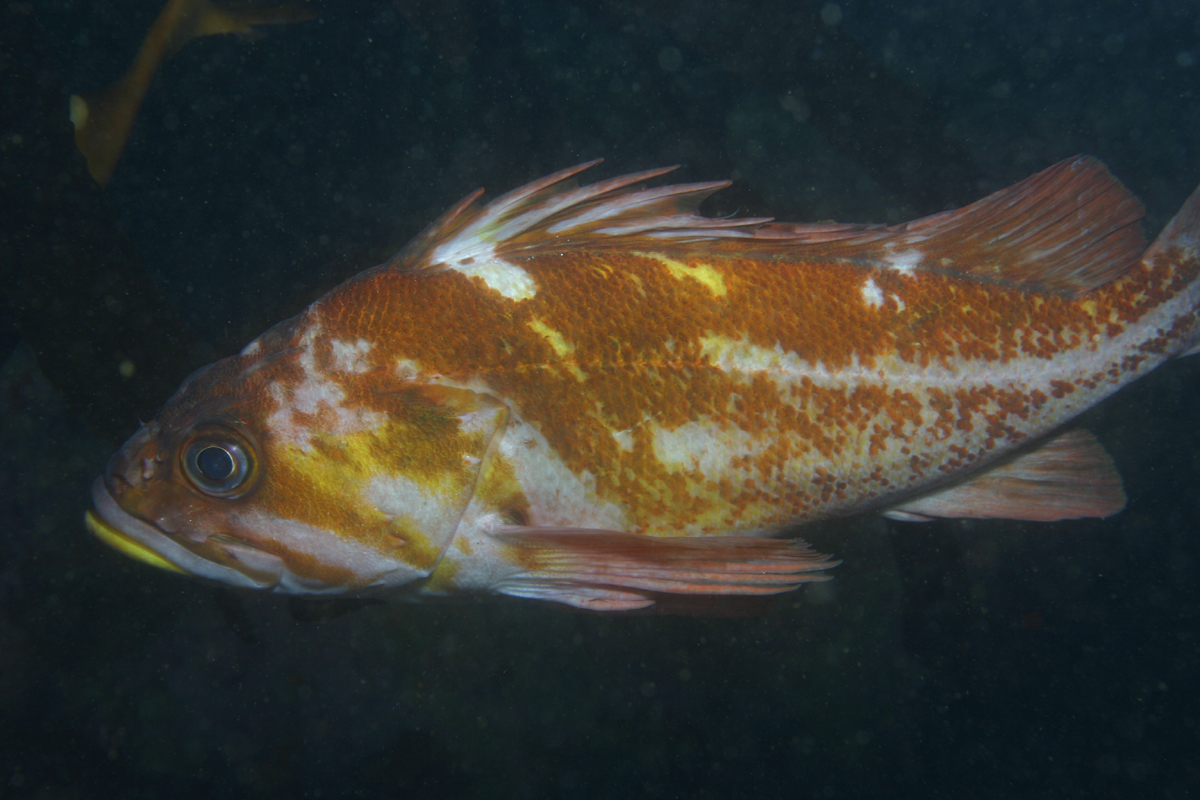
Copper rockfish swimming

The copper rockfish (Sebastes caurinus), also known as the copper seaperch, chucklehead, or white belly rockfish, is a species of marine ray-finned fish belonging to the subfamily Sebastinae, the rockfishes, part of the family Scorpaenidae. It is found in the eastern Pacific.

== Taxonomy and etymology ==
The copper rockfish was originally described in 1844 by the Scottish naval surgeon, naturalist and Arctic explorer John Richardson with the type locality given as the Sitka, Alaska. Some authorities place this species in the subgenus Pteropodus. The specific name caurinus means "northwestern", an allusion to the type locality in Alaska.

== Distribution and habitat ==
The copper rockfish is a relatively common rockfish of the Pacific coast. It is very widespread in its distribution, known from the very northern reaches of the Gulf of Alaska, to the Pacific side of the Baja California peninsula, north of Guerrero Negro. The copper rockfish is also very widely distributed in depth, from the subtidal shallows of about 10 to 183 metres (33 to 600 ft). It is a demersal fish which occurs in rocky areas with high relief.

== Description ==
Copper rockfish are known to be highly variable in coloration, ranging from a dark reddish brown, with pale copper blotching along the sides, to a lighter pinkish brown with a yellowish white mottling on the flanks. At one time it was thought that these variations were two different fish: Sebastes caurinus and Sebastes vexillaris—this is due to the northern and southern populations having different coloration (northern individuals having brown or olive coloration while southern individuals are closer to dull yellow or olive-pink). It is now known however that it is simply one species. Copper rockfish are known to create and communicate with sound produced using the swimbladder and associated muscles; these sounds are used for agonistic behaviors, including territory defense.

Copper rockfish can attain a maximum size of 66 centimetres (26 in) TL and a weight of 4.5 kilograms (9.9 lb).

== Biology and ecology ==
Copper rockfish males are known to mature between three and seven years, while females mature between four and eight years. Generally the larger a female is, the more young she will bear. Copper Rockfish are a ovoviviparous fish, giving birth to live young after a gestation period of around 10 months. Like other rockfish, they are a long-lived fish, reaching ages of over forty years old with the oldest known individual being 55 years old.

Juveniles are almost exclusively found in kelp beds and shallow rocky areas. They begin life feeding primarily on planktonic crustaceans. As they grow, they continue to feed on increasingly larger crustaceans such as shrimp and crabs, as well as cephalopods like squid and octopus. Smaller fish also make up a large part of their diet.

Copper rockfish are preyed on by lingcod, cabezon, and even Pacific salmon. Sea birds and marine mammals, especially pinnipeds are also known to feed on the fish. Copper Rockfish are known for the table quality of their flesh and their willingness as a sportfish.

The adult copper rockfishes are found close to the bottom, often touching it. They are almost always associated in and around rocks, and rarely on sand. This rockfish is known to be very faithful to its chosen home and numerous tagging studies have shown that these rockfish travel no more than a mile from their chosen location or home range. In combination with habitat patchiness and limited larva dispersal distance, this behavior means separate populations genetics differ significantly from each other.

Copper rockfish have also been recorded hybridizing with quillback rockfish (S. maliger) and brown rockfish (S. auriculatus) in the Puget sound.

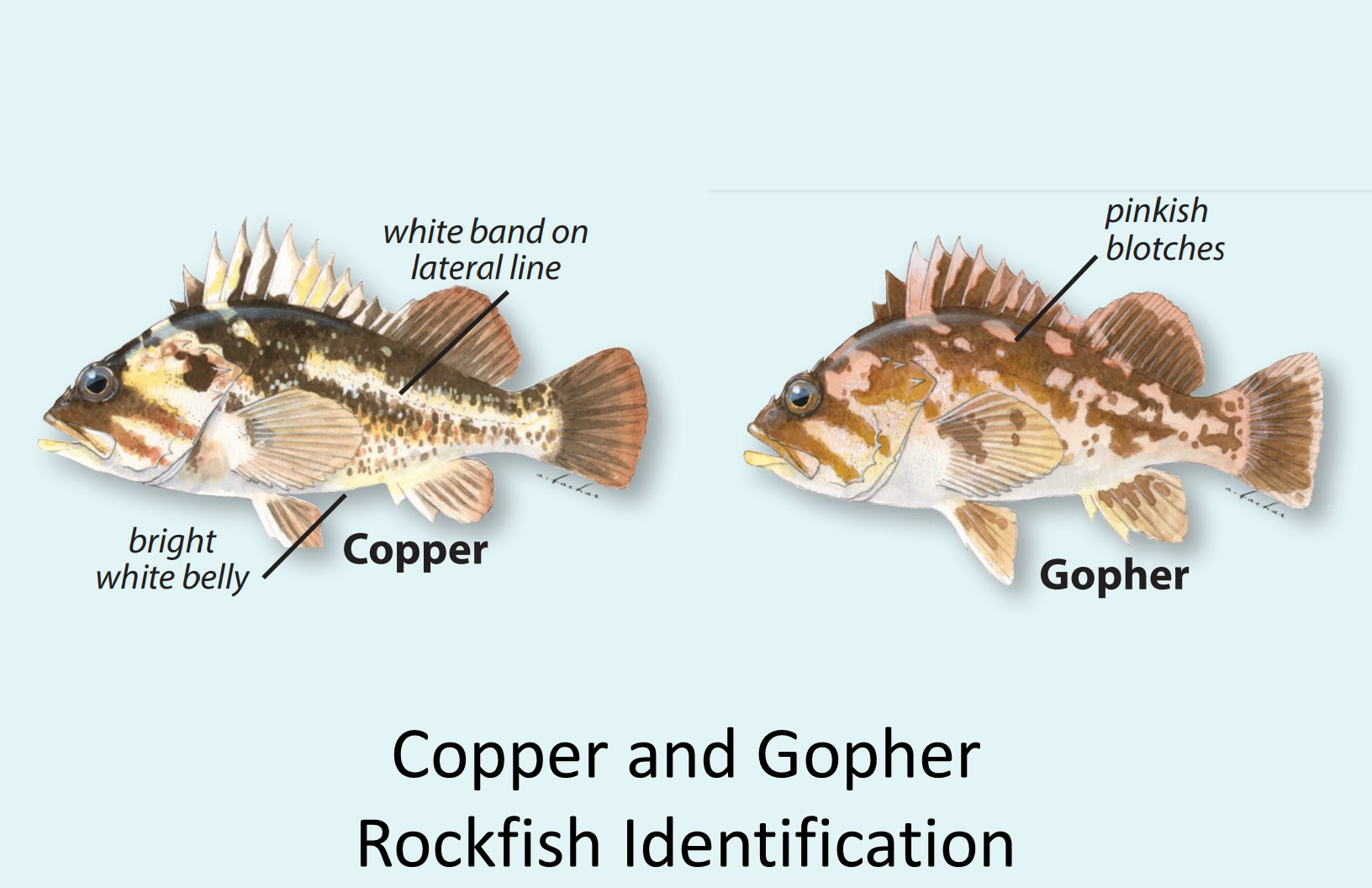
Comparison between the copper rockfish and the gopher rockfish (Sebastes carnatus)

== Fisheries and conservation ==
The copper rockfish is an important component in commercial fisheries in western Mexico, caught using hook and line. It is fished for by recreational anglers in California but in Washington the copper rockfish has been classified as a Species of Greatest Conservation Need (SGCN) under that State's Wildlife Action Plan and as a "Priority Species" under Department of Fish and Wildlife's "Priority Habitat and Species Program" and the recreational fishery in Puget Sound has been closed.
