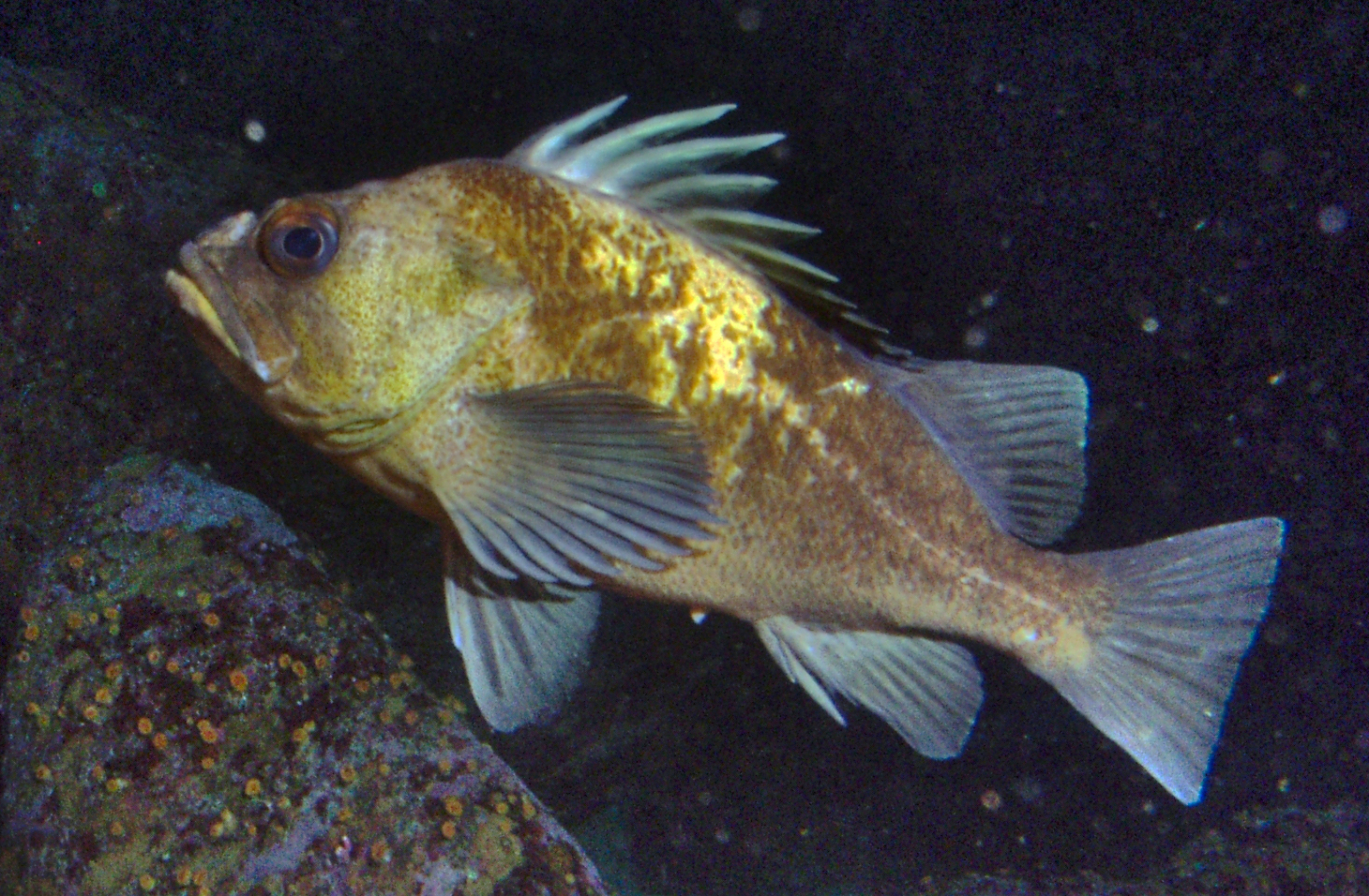
- In California

Scientific classification
- Kingdom: Animalia
- Phylum: Chordata
- Class: Actinopterygii
- Division: Teleostei
- Order: Perciformes
- Family: Scorpaenidae
- Genus: Sebastes
- Species: S. maliger

Binomial name
- Sebastes maliger (D. S. Jordan & C. H. Gilbert 1880)

Synonyms
- Sebastichthys maliger Jordan & Gilbert, 1880

= Quillback rockfish =

Species of fish

The quillback rockfish (Sebastes maliger), also known as the quillback seaperch, is a species of marine ray-finned fish belonging to the subfamily Sebastinae, the rockfishes, part of the family Scorpaenidae. This species primarily dwells in salt water reefs. The average adult weighs 2–7 pounds (0.9 – 3 kg) and may reach 1 m (3 feet) in length. Quillback rockfish are named for the sharp, venomous quills or spines on the dorsal fin. Their mottled orange-brown coloring allows them to blend in with rocky bottom reefs. The quillback rockfish eats mainly crustaceans, but will also eat herring. They are solitary and minimally migratory, but not territorial, and give birth to live young (viviparous). They are a popular sport fish, generally caught in cold water 41–60 m deep, but also to subtidal depths of 275 m.

== Taxonomy ==
The quillback rockfish was originally described in 1880 as Sebastichthys maliger by the American ichthyologists David Starr Jordan and Charles Henry Gilbert with the type locality given as the Farallon Islands off San Francisco, California. Some authorities place this species in the subgenus Pteropodus, of which it is the type species. The specific name maliger is a compound of malus which means "mast" and iger meaning "to bear", a reference to the long spines of the dorsal fin separated by deep notches in the fin membranes.

== Distribution and habitat ==
The quillback rockfish lives along the Pacific coast from the Gulf of Alaska to the northern Channel Islands of Southern California. Like other rockfish species, quillbacks live on the bottom, perching on rocks or hiding in rock crevices.

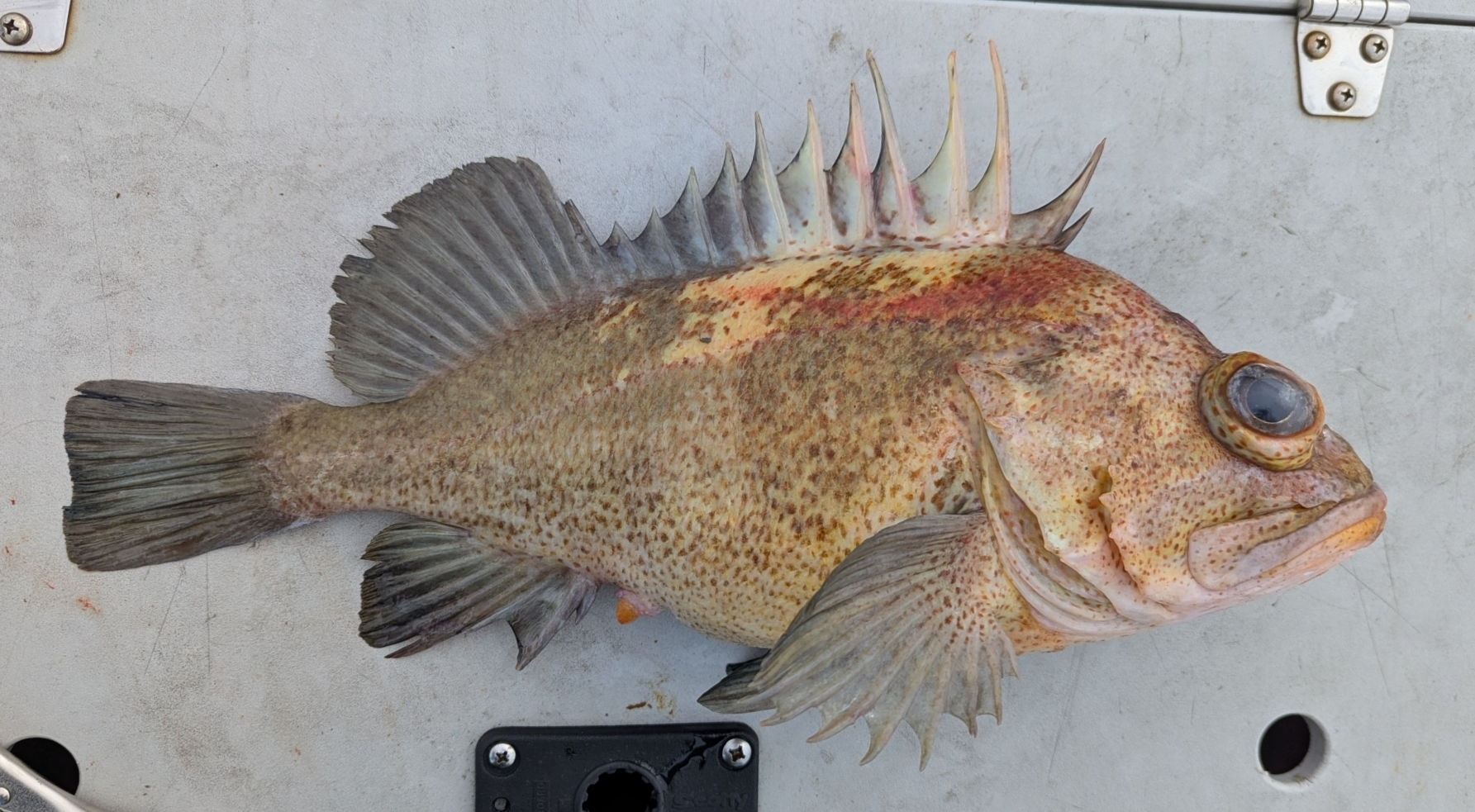
In Alaska

The juveniles stay mainly along the shore, in reefs, sand and eelgrass, while the adult rockfish live in the deeper waters. They are for the most part solitary dwellers, rarely being found in groups. They are rarely found in the open ocean, generally preferring to stay close to kelp, rocks, coral, or lodged in crevices or holes. Despite this, they are not territorial. High densities tend to coincide with peak plant growth. They occupy a variety of habitats in many different areas on the west coast of North America.

Depending on the location, the quillback rockfish are minimally to moderately migratory. On the high-relief rocky reefs of Puget Sound, Washington, they maintain small ranges of 30 square meters, while on low-relief reefs they may stay within a larger, 400 – 1500 square meter, area. They sometimes move seasonally to low-relief reefs when kelp is present (summer).

== Description ==
The quillback rockfish has a maximum recorded total length of 61 cm (24 in) and weight of 3.3 kg (7.3 lb).

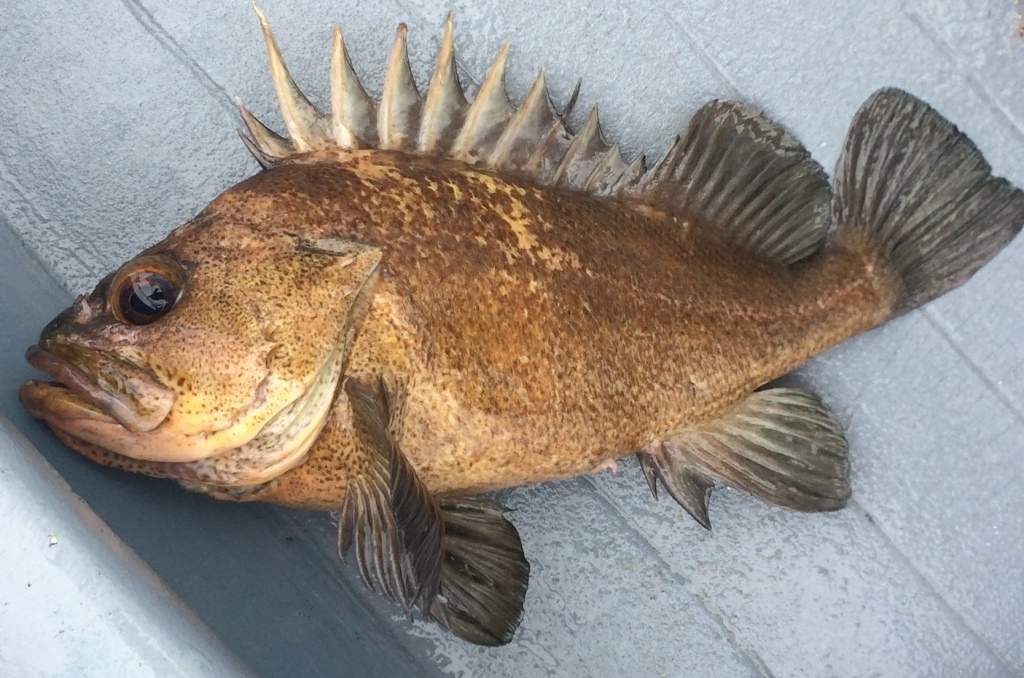
In Washington

The quillback rockfish have a head protected by strong spines, the nasal, preocular, postocular, tympanic and parietal spines are present while there are no supraocular, coronal and nuchal spines. There are 13 spines and between 12 and 14 soft rays in the dorsal fin with the anal fin having 3 spines and 6 or 7 soft rays. The spines in the dorsal fin are very long and the membranes between the spines are deeply incised.

The overall colour of the body is brown to black broken on anteriorly by yellow to white spotting and glitching extending downwards from the back. The colour becomes progressively darker posteriorally. The dorsal fin spines are white or pale yellow but may have dark brown or black markings. Inn some areas this species shows brown or orange speckling on the head which reaches from the nape to underneath the pectoral fins.

== Biology ==
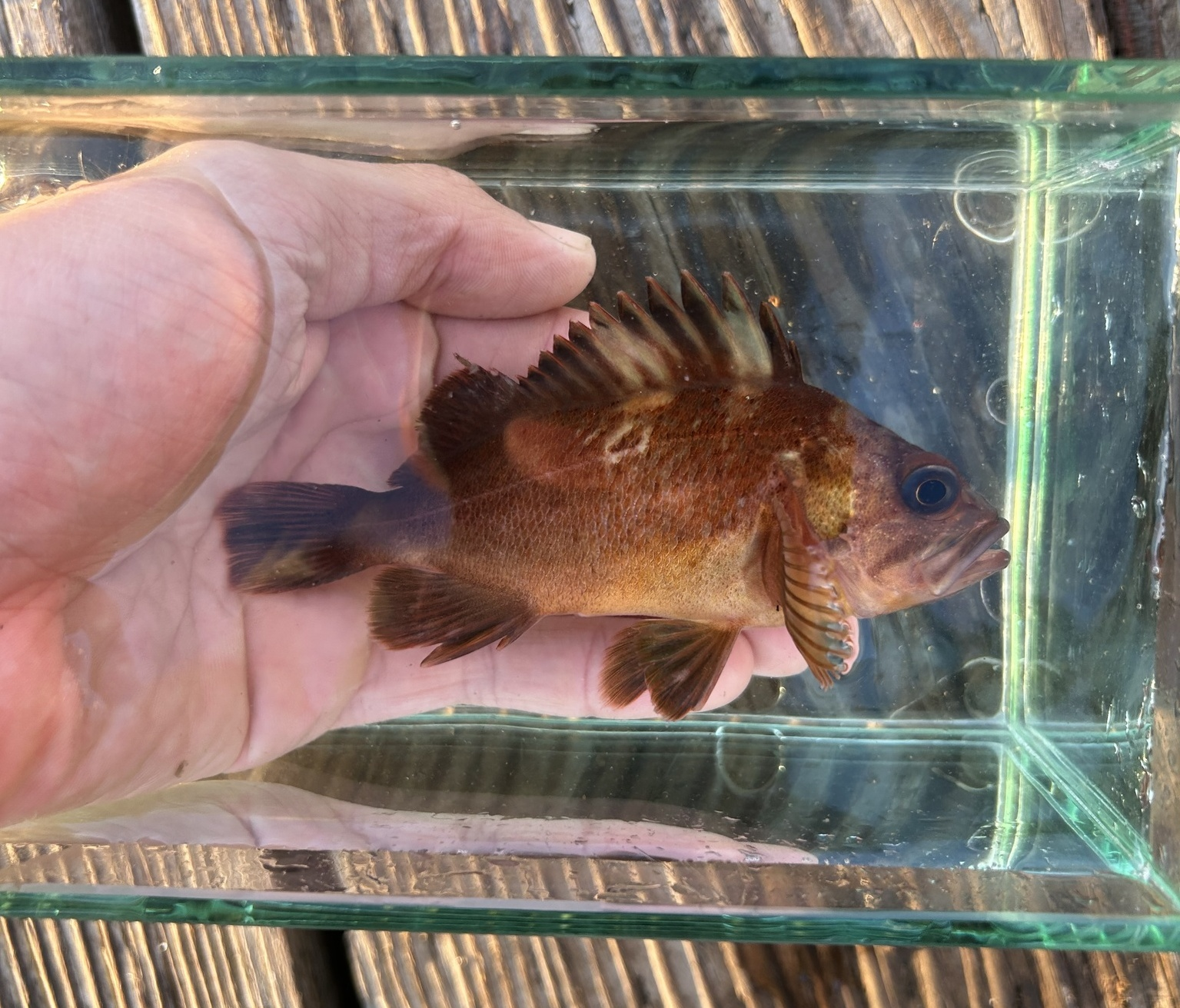
Juvenile, in Washington

The quillback rockfish is ovoviviparous, like other rock fishes, the eggs are internally fertilized and the mother provides nutrients to the developing embryos. They mate in December and the female can store sperm for weeks before it is used for fertilization the larvae are born in April and May in British Columbia and from April to July off Northern and central California. There is a lengthy pelagic larval phase which can have a duration of up to two months, before the larvae settle into a benthic habit. The juveniles are typically found in shallower waters than the adults. This species has been known to live for as long as 95 years and half of the fish are sexually mature at 11 years old. The females in the population tend to be older and larger than the males.

Quillback rockfish are predatory preying on herring, crabs, amphipods, krill and copepods. They are diurnal feeders.

== Fishing ==
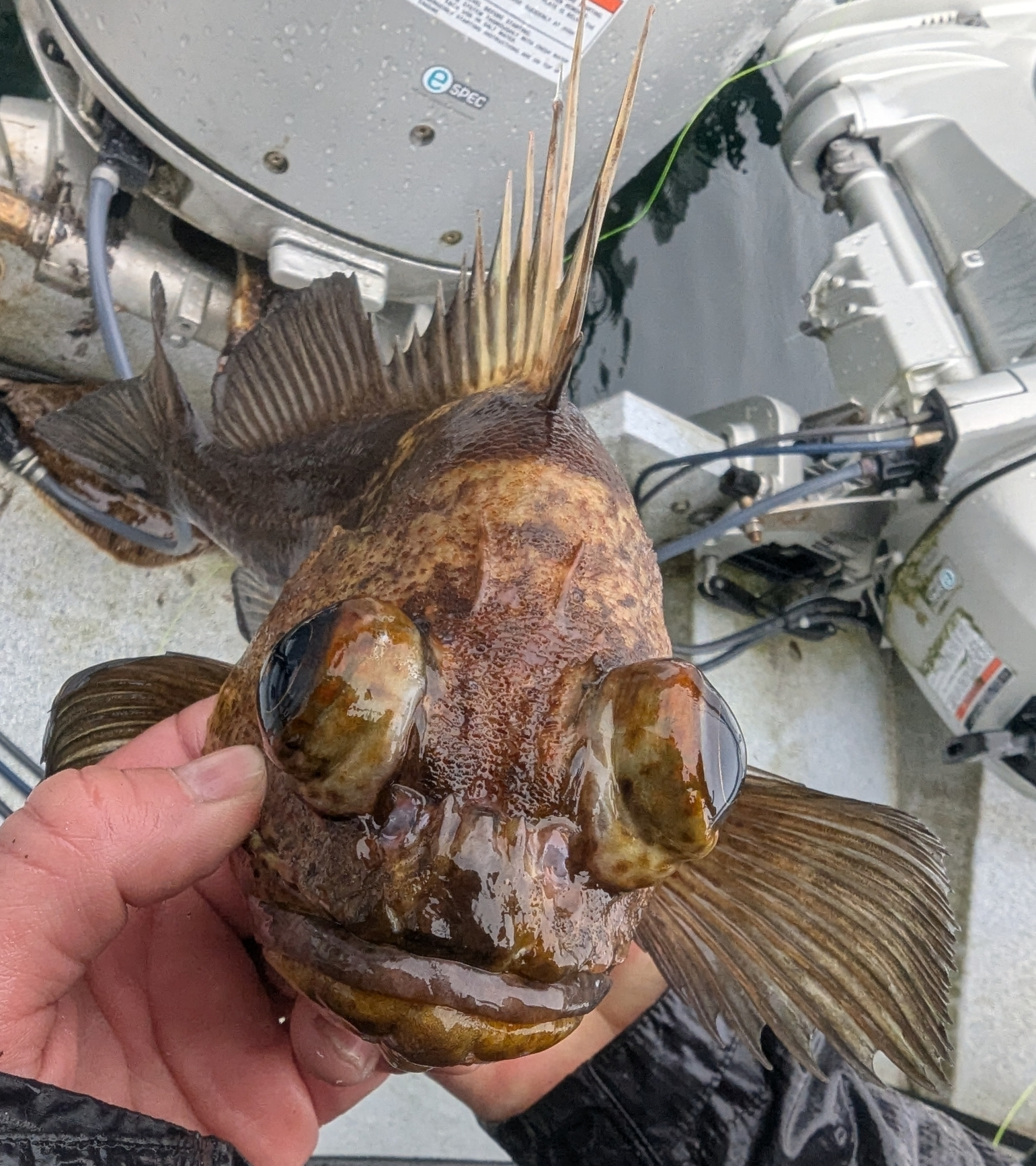
Quillback rockfish with protruding eyes indicative of barotrauma, in Alaska

Rockfish as a group are important to the fishing industry as a food fish. Quillback rockfish have white, flaky meat with a delicate flavor, as befits deep-dwelling cold water species.

From Oregon to southeast Alaska quillback rockfish are an important part of the inshore sport commercial fishery and are also taken by party and private vessels and divers. They are often caught in deep, cold water by bottom fishing with herring or jigging. Most rockfish are landed in deep water by anglers using bottom-fishing tactics or mid-water drifting. These fish are not known for great battles or for large size, although the larger specimens may provide good sport. According to the Oregon Department of Fisheries and Wildlife, the sport harvest of nearshore rockfish (such as quillback, copper and china rockfish) off the Oregon coast has been 6-12 metric tons annually between 2004 and 2009. This is within the sport harvest limits set to maintain the resource.

== Similar species ==
Similar species are the brown rockfish, the copper rockfish, and the China rockfish. The brown rockfish is commonly mistaken for the quillback rockfish. The China rockfish, on the other hand, does not generally resemble the quillback rockfish.
