= List of Dorytomus species =

This is a list of 177 species in Dorytomus, a genus of true weevils in the family Curculionidae.

== Dorytomus species ==
- Dorytomus aericomus Broun, 1886^{c}
- Dorytomus affinis Billberg, 1820^{c}
- Dorytomus alaskanus Casey, 1892^{c}
- Dorytomus albisetosus Broun, 1914^{c}
- Dorytomus alternans Faust, 1882^{c}
- Dorytomus amplipennis Tournier, 1874^{c}
- Dorytomus amplus Casey, 1892^{c}
- Dorytomus annae Korotyaev, 1976^{c}
- Dorytomus arcuatus Dejean, 1821^{c}
- Dorytomus armatus Petri, 1902^{c}
- Dorytomus artjuchovi Korotyaev, 1976^{c}
- Dorytomus auripennis Desbrochers, 1872^{c}
- Dorytomus aurivillii Münster, 1928^{c}
- Dorytomus australis Broun, 1921^{c}
- Dorytomus bajulus Faust, 1890^{c}
- Dorytomus barbirostris Sturm, 1826^{c}
- Dorytomus basithorax Pic, 1901^{c}
- Dorytomus bicolor O'Brien, 1970^{i c}
- Dorytomus bituberculatus Redtenbacher, 1874^{c}
- Dorytomus brachialis Ziegler,^{c}
- Dorytomus brevicollis LeConte, 1876^{i c b}
- Dorytomus brevisetosus Casey, 1892^{i c}
- Dorytomus budarini Korotyaev, 1977^{c}
- Dorytomus carpathicus Petryszak, 1984^{c}
- Dorytomus caspicus Zumpt, 1933^{c}
- Dorytomus castigatus Broun, 1909^{c}
- Dorytomus cephalotes Faust, 1894^{c}
- Dorytomus chinensis Faust, 1882^{c}
- Dorytomus ciliatus Iablokov-khnzorian, 1972^{c}
- Dorytomus cinereus Hochhuth, 1851^{c}
- Dorytomus columbianus Sleeper, 1955^{c}
- Dorytomus consonus Broun, 1913^{c}
- Dorytomus cuneatulus Casey, 1892^{c}
- Dorytomus decorus Klima, 1934^{c}
- Dorytomus dejeani Faust, 1882^{c}
- Dorytomus dentimanus Reitter, 1894^{c}
- Dorytomus dilaticollis Fairmaire, 1887^{c}
- Dorytomus dorsalis (Linnaeus, C., 1758)^{c g}
- Dorytomus edoughensis Desbrochers, 1875^{c}
- Dorytomus egorovi Korotyaev, 1976^{c}
- Dorytomus elegans Sharp, 1883^{c}
- Dorytomus etorofuensis Kono, 1935^{c}
- Dorytomus fallax Faust, 1882^{c}
- Dorytomus fausti Zumpt, 1933^{c}
- Dorytomus filiolus Casey, 1892^{c}
- Dorytomus filirostris
- Dorytomus flavipes Dejean, 1821^{c}
- Dorytomus flavus Sturm, 1826^{c}
- Dorytomus floricola Broun, 1914^{c}
- Dorytomus friebi Zumpt, 1933^{c}
- Dorytomus frivaldszkyi Tournier, 1874^{c}
- Dorytomus frosti Blatchley & Leng, 1916^{c}
- Dorytomus frostii Blatchley, 1916^{i c b}
- Dorytomus fulvescens Broun, 1914^{c}
- Dorytomus fumosus Stephens, 1831^{c}
- Dorytomus fusciceps Casey, 1892^{c}
- Dorytomus galloisi Korotyaev in Ler (ed.), 1996^{c}
- Dorytomus globipennis Roubal, 1931^{c}
- Dorytomus grossus Broun, 1893^{c}
- Dorytomus gyllenhali Faust, 1882^{c}
- Dorytomus hirtipennis Bedel, 1884^{c}
- Dorytomus hirtus LeConte, 1876^{i c}
- Dorytomus hispidus Leconte, 1876^{c}
- Dorytomus howdeni O'Brien, 1970^{i c}
- Dorytomus hystricula Casey, 1892^{i c b}
- Dorytomus ictor (Herbst, J.F.W., 1795)^{c g}
- Dorytomus imbecillus Faust, 1882^{i c b}
- Dorytomus immaculatus Faust, 1882^{c}
- Dorytomus inaequalis Casey, 1892^{i c b}
- Dorytomus incanus Mulsant & Rey, 1859^{c}
- Dorytomus indifferens Casey, 1892^{c}
- Dorytomus indigena Germar, 1817^{c}
- Dorytomus inexpectatus Korotyaev, 1976^{c}
- Dorytomus infirmus Desbr. d. Loges, 1907^{c}
- Dorytomus inquisitor Germar, 1817^{c}
- Dorytomus japonicus Zumpt, 1932^{c}
- Dorytomus kamtshaticus Korotyaev, 1976^{c}
- Dorytomus kerzhneri Egorov, 1974^{c}
- Dorytomus lapponicus Sahlberg, 1900^{c}
- Dorytomus lateralis Dejean, 1821^{c}
- Dorytomus laticollis LeConte, 1876^{i c b}
- Dorytomus lecontei O'Brien, 1970^{i c b}
- Dorytomus leucophyllus (Motschulsky, 1845)^{i g b}
- Dorytomus linnaei Faust, 1882^{c}
- Dorytomus lonae Zumpt, 1933^{c}
- Dorytomus longimanus (Forster, J.R., 1771)^{c g}
- Dorytomus longulus Faust, 1882^{c}
- Dorytomus luridus (Mannerheim, 1853)^{i c g b}
- Dorytomus macropus Redtenbacher, 1858^{c}
- Dorytomus maculatus Stephens, 1829^{c}
- Dorytomus maculipennis Roelofs, 1874^{c}
- Dorytomus majalis Sturm, 1826^{c}
- Dorytomus malachovi Korotyaev, 1976^{c}
- Dorytomus mannerheimi (Gemminger, 1871)^{i c b}
- Dorytomus maorinus Broun, 1913^{c}
- Dorytomus marginatus Casey, 1892^{i c}
- Dorytomus marmoreus Casey, 1892^{i c}
- Dorytomus melanophthalmus (Paykull, G. de, 1792)^{c g}
- Dorytomus melastictus Broun, 1914^{c}
- Dorytomus meridionalis Desbrochers, 1870^{c}
- Dorytomus methvenensis Broun, 1914^{c}
- Dorytomus minutus Dejean, 1821^{c}
- Dorytomus mishka Korotyaev, 1976^{c}
- Dorytomus mongolicus Zumpt, 1932^{c}
- Dorytomus mucidus (Say, 1832)^{i c b}
- Dorytomus nanus Dejean, 1821^{c}
- Dorytomus nebulosus
- Dorytomus necessarius Faust, 1882^{c}
- Dorytomus neglectus Korotyaev in Ler (ed.), 1996^{c}
- Dorytomus nigrifrons Dejean, 1821^{c}
- Dorytomus nordenskioldi Faust, 1882^{c}
- Dorytomus notaroides Kono, 1930^{c}
- Dorytomus nothus Rey, 1895^{c}
- Dorytomus nubeculinus Casey, 1892^{c}
- Dorytomus occalescens
- Dorytomus ochraceus Broun, 1881^{c}
- Dorytomus pallidesignatus Gyllenhal, L. in Schönherr, C.J., 1836^{c}
- Dorytomus parvicollis Casey, 1892^{i c b}
- Dorytomus paykulli Faust, 1882^{c}
- Dorytomus pectoralis Billberg, 1820^{c}
- Dorytomus peneckei Zumpt, 1933^{c}
- Dorytomus petax Sahlberg, 1823^{c}
- Dorytomus pilumnus Redtenbacher, 1858^{c}
- Dorytomus plagiatus Dahl,^{c}
- Dorytomus planirostris Tournier, 1874^{c}
- Dorytomus pomorum Billberg, 1820^{c}
- Dorytomus puberulus
- Dorytomus pygmaeus Sturm, 1826^{c}
- Dorytomus rectirostris Faust, 1882^{c}
- Dorytomus repandus Dejean, 1821^{c}
- Dorytomus reussi Formánek, 1908^{c}
- Dorytomus roelofsi Faust, 1882^{c}
- Dorytomus ruber Faust, 1894^{c}
- Dorytomus rubidus Tanner, 1939^{c}
- Dorytomus rubrirostris (Gravenhorst, )^{c g}
- Dorytomus ruessi Formanek, 1908^{g}
- Dorytomus rufatus Zumpt, 1932^{c g}
- Dorytomus rufirostris Broun, 1880^{c}
- Dorytomus rufulus (Mannerheim, 1853)^{i c b}
- Dorytomus rufus (Say, 1832)
- Dorytomus sahlbergi Faust, 1882^{c}
- Dorytomus salicinus
- Dorytomus salicis Walton, 1851^{c}
- Dorytomus sanguinolentus Bedel, 1884^{c}
- Dorytomus sanshiensis Kono & Morimoto, 1960^{c}
- Dorytomus schoenherri Faust, 1882^{c}
- Dorytomus septentrionalis Korotyaev, 1976^{c}
- Dorytomus setosus Zumpt, 1933^{c}
- Dorytomus shikotanus Kono, 1935^{c}
- Dorytomus silbermanni Wencker, 1886^{c}
- Dorytomus simplex Gozis, 1886^{c}
- Dorytomus stilla Sturm, 1826^{c}
- Dorytomus subcinctus Faust, 1882^{c}
- Dorytomus subdistans Voss, 1960^{c}
- Dorytomus subsignatus Leconte, 1876^{c}
- Dorytomus subsimilis Blatchley & Leng, 1916^{c}
- Dorytomus subsinuatus Blatchley & Leng, 1916^{c}
- Dorytomus sudus Broun, 1881^{c}
- Dorytomus suratus Seidlitz, 1875^{c}
- Dorytomus surutus Dejean, 1821^{c}
- Dorytomus suvorovi Reitter, 1911^{c}
- Dorytomus taeniatus (Fabricius, J.C., 1781)^{c}
- Dorytomus terrestris Broun, 1914^{c}
- Dorytomus tortrix (Linnaeus, C., 1760)^{c g}
- Dorytomus tremulae Dejean, 1821^{c}
- Dorytomus turkestanicus Formánek, 1912^{c}
- Dorytomus ussuricus Korotyaev in Ler (ed.), 1996^{c}
- Dorytomus vagenotatus Casey, 1892^{i c b}
- Dorytomus variegatus Dejean, 1821^{c}
- Dorytomus ventralis Dejean, 1821^{c}
- Dorytomus villosulus
- Dorytomus vittatus Broun, 1921^{c}
- Dorytomus vorax Germar, 1817^{c}
- Dorytomus williamsi Scudder, 1893^{c}
- Dorytomus winkleri Zumpt, 1933^{c}
- Dorytomus winteri Korotyaev, 1976^{c}
- Dorytomus zinovjevi Korotyaev, 1976^{c}

Data sources: i = ITIS, c = Catalogue of Life, g = GBIF, b = Bugguide.net
