= Ephippiatus =

Ephippiatus may refer to:

- Argyripnus ephippiatus, species of ray-finned fish
- Bombus ephippiatus, species of bumblebee
- Ellescus ephippiatus, species of true weevil
- Lacinius ephippiatus, species of arachnid
- Lissonotus ephippiatus, species of beetle
- Pericompsus ephippiatus, species of ground beetle
- Thorogobius ephippiatus, species of goby
