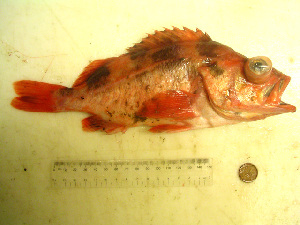

Scientific classification
- Kingdom: Animalia
- Phylum: Chordata
- Class: Actinopterygii
- Order: Perciformes
- Family: Scorpaenidae
- Genus: Sebastes
- Species: S. crameri

Binomial name
- Sebastes crameri (Jordan, 1897)

Synonyms
- Sebastodes crameri Jordan, 1897

= Darkblotched rockfish =

Species of fish

The darkblotched rockfish (Sebastes crameri) is a species of marine ray-finned fish, a rockfish belonging to the subfamily Sebastinae of the scorpionfish family Scorpaenidae. This is a deepwater species of the North Pacific Ocean.

== Taxonomy ==
The darkblotched rockfish was first formally described as Sebastodes crameri in 1897 by the American ichthyologist David Starr Jordan with the type locality given as off Tillamook, Oregon. Some authorities place this species in the subgenus Eosebastes. The specific name honors Frank Cramer, the American biologist and educator, who was a student of Jordan’s and who studied the cranial morphology of rockfishes.

== Description ==
The darkblotched rockfish has a deep body which in life is colored white or pink marked with brown bars, once caught the color changes to pink or orange with 3 to 5 dark bars on their back. There is a dark blotch on the operculum. There are 13 spines and 12 to 14 soft rays in the dorsal fin while the anal fin has 3 spines and between 5 and 7 soft rays. The second spine in the anal fin is shorter than the third. The head bears strongly to moderately robust spines with spines on the nasal, preocular, supraocular, postocular, tympanic, parietal and nuchal bones; however, there are no coronal spines. The caudal fin is moderately emarginate. The maximum published total length is 58 cm (23 in).

== Distribution and habitat ==
The darkblotched rockfish is found in the North Pacific Ocean where it occurs from southeast of the Zhemchug Canyon in the Bering Sea east and south to Santa Catalina Island in California. The very young darkblotched rockfish are pelagic and are found in surface waters away from the coast. As juveniles they settle and become benthic over soft muddy or hard rocky substrates. As they grow larger they move into deeper waters, becoming benthic in areas with cobbles or boulders. Off British Columbia the adults are caught between 140 and 435 m (459 and 1,427 ft).

== Biology ==
The darkblotched rockfish has an extended breeding season with the fishes mating in August to December, the eggs being fertilized between October and March and the live young being released from November to June. Each female may release between 20,000 and 610,000 young. The release occurring once in each breeding season. In British Columbia these fishes reach sexual maturity when they are 8 or 9 years old and the maximum recorded age is 105 years. These fish are sedentary as adults and even the young fishes have a limited dispersal capability, typically less than 100 km (62 mi). They are often associated with other species of demersal fish such as Pacific ocean perch (Sebastes alutus), arrowtooth flounder (Atheresthes stomas), and yellowmouth rockfish (Sebastes reedi). The juveniles are preyed on by albacore (Thunnus alalunga), Pacific salmon (Oncorhynchus spp) and Pacific hake (Merluccius productus). The main food of adults is invertebrates. The fin spines have grooves with venom glands at their bases.

== Utilization ==
The darkblotched rockfish is caught as bycatch in the fishery for Pacific hake and the closed swimbladder means that they are highly susceptible to injury when taken from deep waters to the surface and this means that the bycatch has near 100% mortality. The recreational fishery for this species off Washington is closed.
