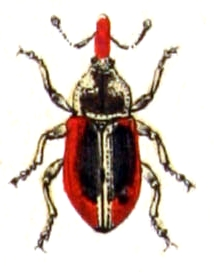
- Ellescus scanicus

Scientific classification
- Domain: Eukaryota
- Kingdom: Animalia
- Phylum: Arthropoda
- Class: Insecta
- Order: Coleoptera
- Suborder: Polyphaga
- Infraorder: Cucujiformia
- Family: Curculionidae
- Subfamily: Curculioninae
- Tribe: Ellescini; Thomson, 1859

= Ellescini =

Tribe of beetles

Ellescini is a tribe of true weevils in the family of beetles known as Curculionidae. There are at least 3 genera and about 18 described species in Ellescini.

== Genera ==
These three genera belong to the tribe Ellescini:

- Dorytomus Germar, 1817^{i c g b}
- Ellescus Dejean, 1821^{i c g b}
- Proctorus LeConte, 1876^{i c g b}

Data sources: i = ITIS, c = Catalogue of Life, g = GBIF, b = Bugguide.net
