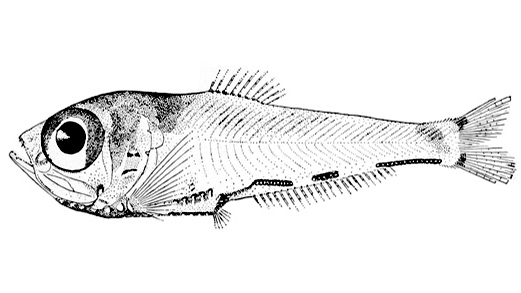
- Argyripnus ephippiatus

Scientific classification
- Kingdom: Animalia
- Phylum: Chordata
- Class: Actinopterygii
- Order: Stomiiformes
- Family: Sternoptychidae
- Subfamily: Maurolicinae
- Genus: Argyripnus; C. H. Gilbert & Cramer, 1897

= Argyripnus =

Argyripnus Temporal range: Late Oligocene to Present 25–0 Ma

Genus of fishes

Argyripnus is an oceanic ray-finned fish genus in the marine hatchetfish family Sternoptychidae. They are commonly known as bristle-mouth fishes, but that may also refer to the related bristlemouth family (Gonostomatidae). A. iridescens is called "pearlside", which usually refers to the closely related genus Maurolicus.

== Species ==
There are currently seven recognized species in this genus:

- Argyripnus atlanticus Maul, 1952
- Argyripnus brocki Struhsaker, 1973 (Brock's Bristle-mouth Fish)
- Argyripnus electronus Parin, 1992
- Argyripnus ephippiatus C. H. Gilbert & Cramer, 1897 (Gilbert & Cramer's Bristle-mouth Fish)
- Argyripnus hulleyi Quéro, Spitz & Vayne, 2009 (Reunion bristle-mouth fish)
- Argyripnus iridescens McCulloch, 1926 (Brilliant Pearlside)
- Argyripnus pharos Harold & Lancaster, 2003

Fossils of bristle-mouth fishes show that the genus was already distinct in the Late Oligocene, more than 23 million years ago.
