= Argyripnus ephippiatus =

Scientific classification
- Domain: Eukaryota
- Kingdom: Animalia
- Phylum: Chordata
- Class: Actinopterygii
- Order: Stomiiformes
- Family: Sternoptychidae
- Genus: Argyripnus
- Species: A. ephippiatus

Binomial name
- Argyripnus ephippiatus C. H. Gilbert & Cramer, 1897

Species of fish

Argyripnus ephippiatus, commonly known as Gilbert & Cramer's bristle-mouth fish, is a species of ray-finned fish in the genus Argyripnus found in the Pacific Ocean. This species reaches a length of 8.9 cm (3.5 in).
