= Argyripnus atlanticus =

Scientific classification
- Domain: Eukaryota
- Kingdom: Animalia
- Phylum: Chordata
- Class: Actinopterygii
- Order: Stomiiformes
- Family: Sternoptychidae
- Genus: Argyripnus
- Species: A. atlanticus

Binomial name
- Argyripnus atlanticus Maul, 1952

Species of fish

Argyripnus atlanticus is a species of ray-finned fish in the genus Argyripnus.

The fish is found worldwide in the tropical waters of the Eastern Atlantic, from Madeira to south of the Canary Islands. In the Western Atlantic, in the Bahamas and the Caribbean Sea. In the Eastern Central Pacific, it is found in Hawaii. This species reaches a length of 7.7 cm (3.0 in).
