= Lissonotus confinis =

Scientific classification
- Kingdom: Animalia
- Phylum: Arthropoda
- Class: Insecta
- Order: Coleoptera
- Suborder: Polyphaga
- Infraorder: Cucujiformia
- Family: Cerambycidae
- Genus: Lissonotus
- Species: L. confinis

Binomial name
- Lissonotus confinis Aurivillius, 1915

Species of beetle

Lissonotus confinis is a species of longhorn beetle in the family Cerambycidae. It was described by Per Olof Christopher Aurivillius in 1915.
