= Dorytomus inaequalis =

Scientific classification
- Kingdom: Animalia
- Phylum: Arthropoda
- Clade: Pancrustacea
- Class: Insecta
- Order: Coleoptera
- Suborder: Polyphaga
- Infraorder: Cucujiformia
- Family: Curculionidae
- Genus: Dorytomus
- Species: D. inaequalis

Binomial name
- Dorytomus inaequalis Casey, 1892

Species of beetle

Dorytomus inaequalis is a species of true weevil in the beetle family Curculionidae. It is found in North America.
