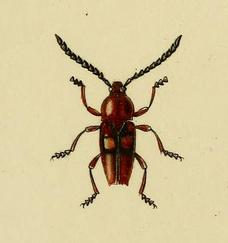

Scientific classification
- Kingdom: Animalia
- Phylum: Arthropoda
- Class: Insecta
- Order: Coleoptera
- Suborder: Polyphaga
- Infraorder: Cucujiformia
- Family: Cerambycidae
- Genus: Lissonotus
- Species: L. biguttatus

Binomial name
- Lissonotus biguttatus Dalman in Schoenherr, 1817

= Lissonotus biguttatus =

Species of beetle

Lissonotus biguttatus is a species of beetle in the family Cerambycidae. It was described by Dalman in 1817.
