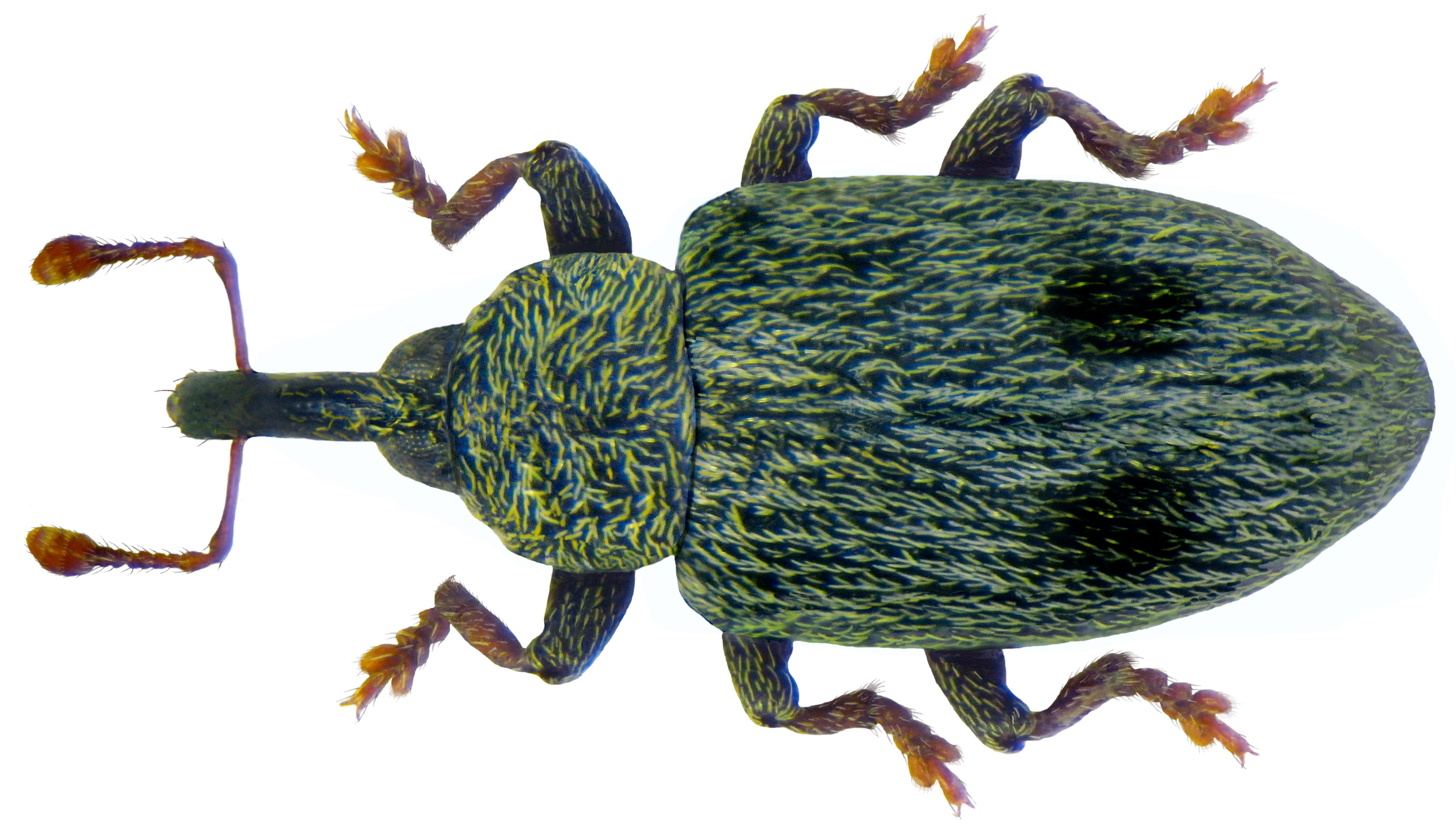
- Ellescus bipunctatus

Scientific classification
- Kingdom: Animalia
- Phylum: Arthropoda
- Class: Insecta
- Order: Coleoptera
- Suborder: Polyphaga
- Infraorder: Cucujiformia
- Family: Curculionidae
- Genus: Ellescus
- Species: E. bipunctatus

Binomial name
- Ellescus bipunctatus (Linnaeus, 1758)

= Ellescus bipunctatus =

Species of beetle

Ellescus bipunctatus is a species of weevil native to Europe.
