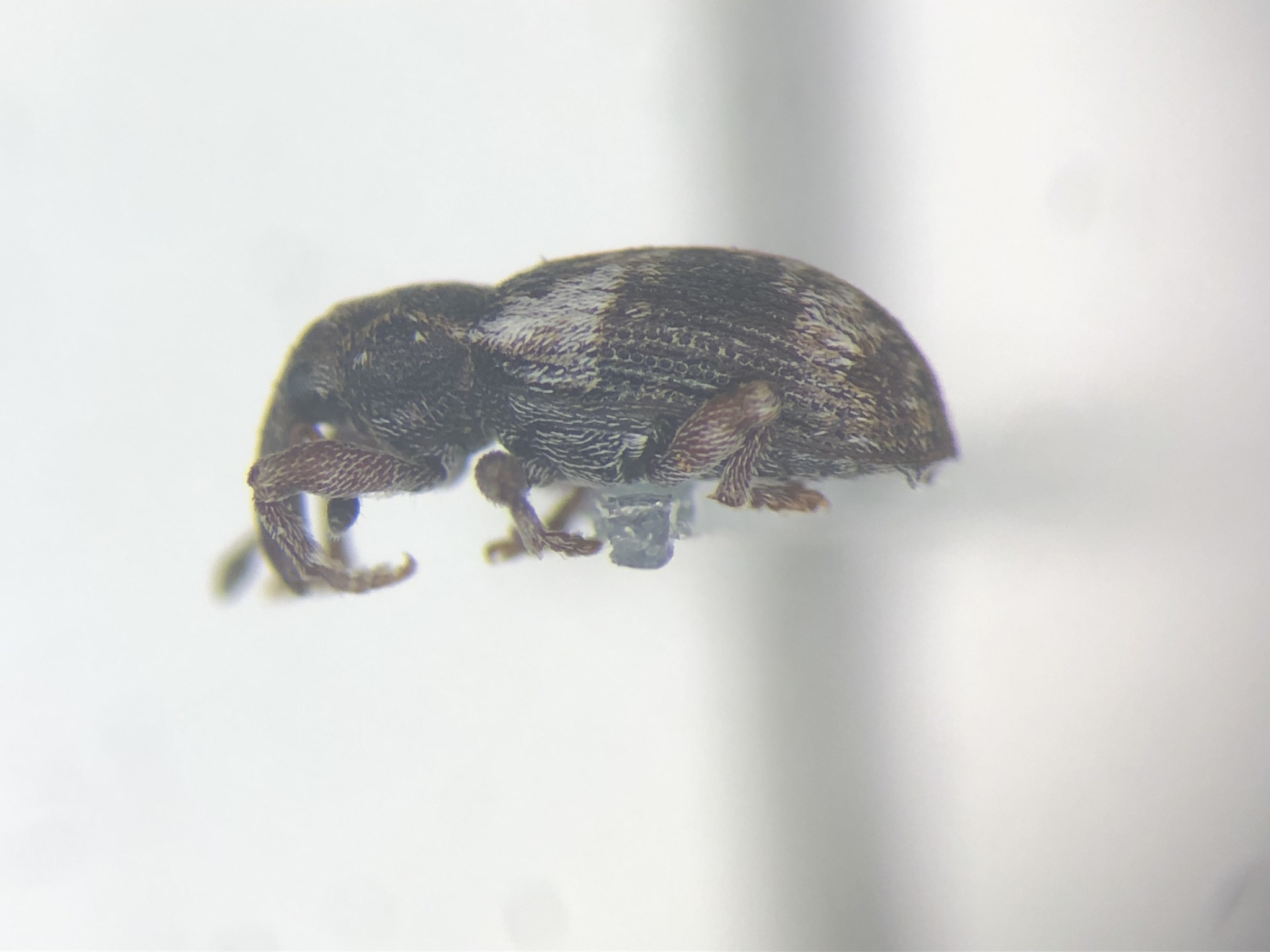

Scientific classification
- Kingdom: Animalia
- Phylum: Arthropoda
- Clade: Pancrustacea
- Class: Insecta
- Order: Coleoptera
- Suborder: Polyphaga
- Infraorder: Cucujiformia
- Superfamily: Curculionoidea
- Family: Curculionidae
- Genus: Proctorus
- Species: P. decipiens

Binomial name
- Proctorus decipiens (LeConte, 1876)

= Proctorus decipiens =

Species of beetle

Proctorus decipiens is a species of true weevil in the beetle family Curculionidae. It is found in North America.
