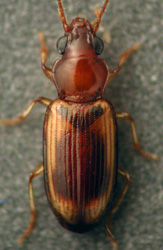
- Pericompsus laetulus

Scientific classification
- Kingdom: Animalia
- Phylum: Arthropoda
- Class: Insecta
- Order: Coleoptera
- Suborder: Adephaga
- Family: Carabidae
- Subfamily: Trechinae
- Tribe: Bembidiini
- Subtribe: Tachyina
- Genus: Pericompsus; LeConte, 1852

Subgenera
- Eidocompsus Erwin, 1974; Pericompsus LeConte, 1852; Upocompsus

= Pericompsus =

Genus of beetles

Pericompsus is a genus of ground beetles in the family Carabidae. There are more than 70 described species in Pericompsus.

== Species ==
These 71 species belong to the genus Pericompsus:

- Pericompsus acon Erwin, 1974 (South America)
- Pericompsus alcimus Erwin, 1974 (South America)
- Pericompsus amygdali Erwin, 1974 (South America)
- Pericompsus anassa Erwin, 1974 (South America)
- Pericompsus andinus (Jensen-Haarup, 1910) (Argentina)
- Pericompsus australis (Schaum, 1863) (Australasia)
- Pericompsus bilbo Erwin, 1974 (South America)
- Pericompsus bogani (Darlington, 1963) (Australia)
- Pericompsus brasiliensis (R.F.Sahlberg, 1847) (South America and Mexico)
- Pericompsus callicalymma Erwin, 1974 (South America)
- Pericompsus carinatus Erwin, 1974 (South America)
- Pericompsus catamarcensis Roig-Juñent & Scheibler, 2004 (Argentina)
- Pericompsus centroplagiatus (Putzeys, 1845) (South America)
- Pericompsus circuliformis (Solier, 1849) (Chile)
- Pericompsus clitellaris (Erichson, 1847) (South America)
- Pericompsus commotes Erwin, 1974 (South America)
- Pericompsus concinnus (LaFerté-Sénectère, 1841) (South America)
- Pericompsus cordatus Baehr, 2017 (Australia)
- Pericompsus crossarchon Erwin, 1974 (South America)
- Pericompsus crossodmos Erwin, 1974 (South America)
- Pericompsus crossotus Erwin, 1974 (South America)
- Pericompsus diabalius Erwin, 1974 (South America)
- Pericompsus dynastes Erwin, 1974 (South America)
- Pericompsus elegantulus (LaFerté-Sénectère, 1841) (the Caribbean Sea)
- Pericompsus ephippiatus (Say, 1830) (Central America, North America, and Mexico)
- Pericompsus eubothrus Erwin, 1974 (South America)
- Pericompsus gongylus Erwin, 1974 (Mexico)
- Pericompsus gracilior (Bates, 1884) (South America and Mexico)
- Pericompsus grossepunctatus Bates, 1871 (South America)
- Pericompsus habitans (Sloane, 1896) (Australia)
- Pericompsus hirsutus Schaum, 1863 (South America)
- Pericompsus histrionellus Bates, 1884 (South America)
- Pericompsus immaculatus Bates, 1871 (South America and Mexico)
- Pericompsus incisus Bates, 1871 (South America)
- Pericompsus jamcubanus Erwin, 1974 (the Caribbean)
- Pericompsus jeppeseni (Jensen-Haarup, 1910) (Argentina)
- Pericompsus jucundus Schaum, 1859 (South America)
- Pericompsus laetulus LeConte, 1852 (Central America, North America, and Mexico)
- Pericompsus leechi Erwin, 1974 (Mexico)
- Pericompsus leucocarenus Erwin, 1974 (Central America and Mexico)
- Pericompsus longulus Bates, 1878 (Central America and Mexico)
- Pericompsus metallicus Bates, 1871 (South America)
- Pericompsus micropegasus Erwin, 1974 (South America)
- Pericompsus morantensis Erwin, 1974 (the Lesser Antilles and Hispaniola)
- Pericompsus nevermanni (Darlington, 1934) (Central America)
- Pericompsus nonandinus Erwin, 1974 (South America)
- Pericompsus olliffi (Sloane, 1896) (Australia)
- Pericompsus pauli Erwin, 1974 (Central America and Mexico)
- Pericompsus pegasus Erwin, 1974 (South America)
- Pericompsus philipi Erwin, 1974 (the Caribbean)
- Pericompsus picticornis Bates, 1871 (South America)
- Pericompsus polychaetus Erwin, 1974 (South America)
- Pericompsus prionomus Erwin, 1974 (Central America)
- Pericompsus pubifrons (Darlington, 1963) (Australia)
- Pericompsus punctipennis (W.J.MacLeay, 1871) (Australia)
- Pericompsus reichei (Putzeys, 1845) (South America and Mexico)
- Pericompsus reticulatus Erwin, 1974 (South America)
- Pericompsus rorschachinus Erwin, 1974 (South America)
- Pericompsus sagma Erwin, 1974 (Mexico)
- Pericompsus sellatus LeConte, 1852 (North America and Mexico)
- Pericompsus semistriatus (Blackburn, 1888) (Australia)
- Pericompsus seticollis (Sloane, 1896) (Australia)
- Pericompsus silicis Erwin, 1974 (South America)
- Pericompsus stenocitharus Erwin, 1974 (South America)
- Pericompsus striatopunctatus Baehr, 1983 (South America)
- Pericompsus subincisus Erwin, 1974 (South America)
- Pericompsus tetraphalarus Erwin, 1974 (South America)
- Pericompsus tlaloc Erwin, 1974 (Central America and Mexico)
- Pericompsus tolype Erwin, 1974 (South America)
- Pericompsus univittatus (Jensen-Haarup, 1910) (Chile and Argentina)
- Pericompsus yarrensis (Blackburn, 1892) (Australia)
