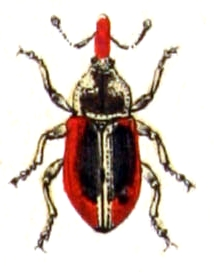

Scientific classification
- Kingdom: Animalia
- Phylum: Arthropoda
- Clade: Pancrustacea
- Class: Insecta
- Order: Coleoptera
- Suborder: Polyphaga
- Infraorder: Cucujiformia
- Superfamily: Curculionoidea
- Family: Curculionidae
- Genus: Ellescus
- Species: E. scanicus

Binomial name
- Ellescus scanicus (Paykull, 1792)

= Ellescus scanicus =

Species of beetle

Ellescus scanicus is a species of true weevil in the beetle family Curculionidae. It is found in North America and Europe.
