= Lissonotus rubripes =

Scientific classification
- Kingdom: Animalia
- Phylum: Arthropoda
- Class: Insecta
- Order: Coleoptera
- Suborder: Polyphaga
- Infraorder: Cucujiformia
- Family: Cerambycidae
- Genus: Lissonotus
- Species: L. rubripes

Binomial name
- Lissonotus rubripes Tippmann, 1960

Species of beetle

Lissonotus rubripes is a species of beetle in the family Cerambycidae. It was described by Tippmann in 1960.
