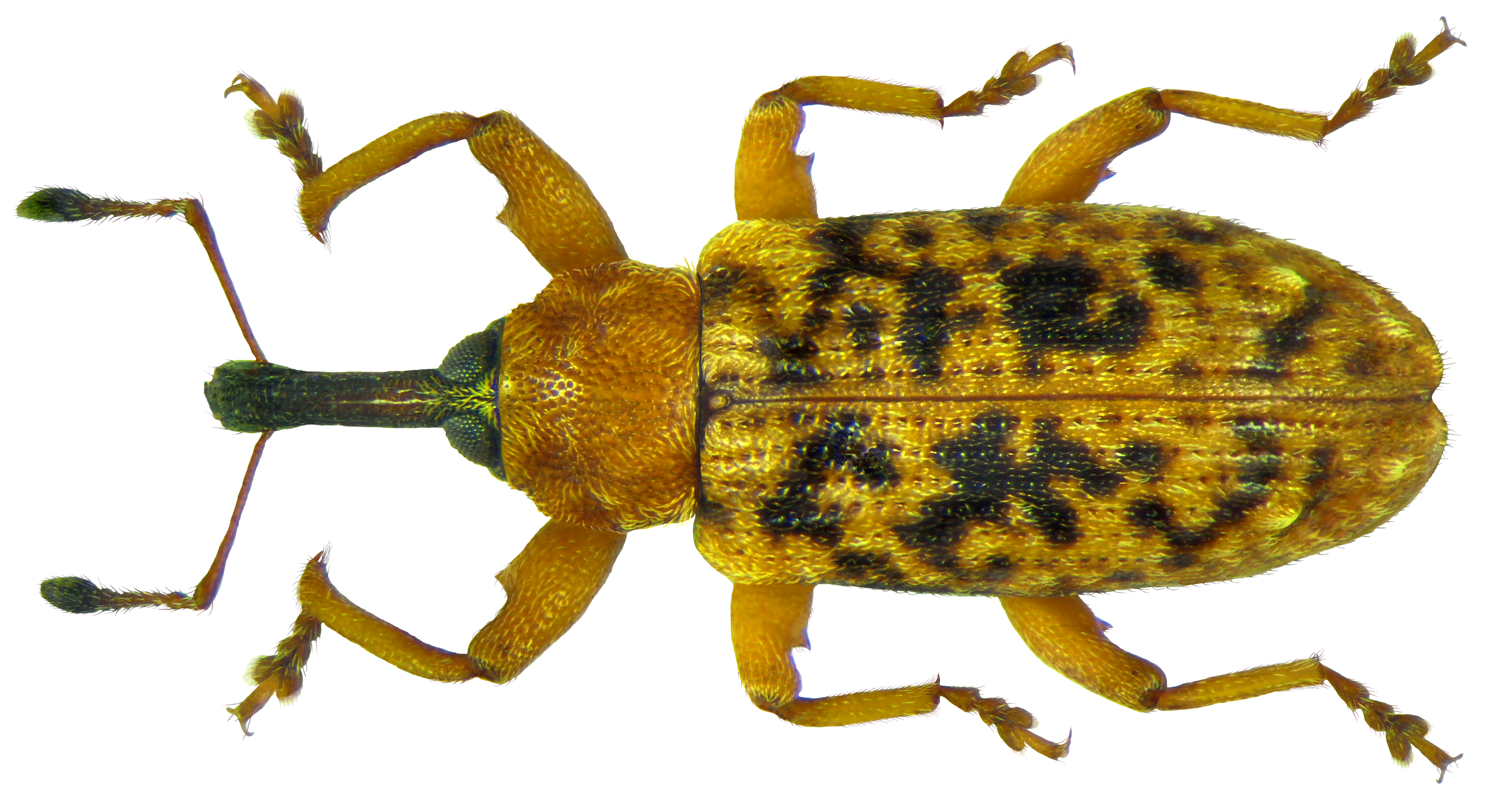
- Dorytomus taeniatus 3-4,5 mm

Scientific classification
- Domain: Eukaryota
- Kingdom: Animalia
- Phylum: Arthropoda
- Class: Insecta
- Order: Coleoptera
- Suborder: Polyphaga
- Infraorder: Cucujiformia
- Family: Curculionidae
- Genus: Dorytomus
- Species: D. taeniatus

Binomial name
- Dorytomus taeniatus (Fabricius, 1781)

= Dorytomus taeniatus =

Species of beetle

Dorytomus taeniatus is a species of weevil native to Europe. It was first described by Johann Christian Fabricius in 1781. The larvae cause a small growth (known as a gall) on the catkins of willows (Salix species).

== Description ==
Eggs are laid during the autumn in the axils of catkin buds and hatch the following spring. The larvae cause an inconspicuous distortion of, usually, female catkins, thickening the rachis. Catkins drop earlier than uninfected catkins and the larvae pupate in the soil. Close examination of the gall is necessary as Redfern et al. (2011) note that sometimes, thickening of the rachis can be wound tissue rather than a gall and according to Plant Parasites of Europe identification is only possible by examining the weevils.

The gall has been recorded from white willow (S. alba), eared willow (S. aurita), goat willow (S. caprea), grey willow (S. cinerea) and purple willow (S.purpurea).

Adults are 4–5 millimetres (0.16–0.20 in) long and brownish-black to black. They can be found from May onwards, browsing on the leaves, removing patches of tissue and exposing the network of fine veins.

== Distribution ==
Found in western and central Europe including Great Britain (common) and Scandinavia.
