= Dorytomus mannerheimi =

Scientific classification
- Domain: Eukaryota
- Kingdom: Animalia
- Phylum: Arthropoda
- Class: Insecta
- Order: Coleoptera
- Suborder: Polyphaga
- Infraorder: Cucujiformia
- Family: Curculionidae
- Genus: Dorytomus
- Species: D. mannerheimi

Binomial name
- Dorytomus mannerheimi (Gemminger, 1871)

Species of beetle

Dorytomus mannerheimi is a species of true weevil in the beetle family Curculionidae. It is found in North America.
