= Argyripnus electronus =

Scientific classification
- Domain: Eukaryota
- Kingdom: Animalia
- Phylum: Chordata
- Class: Actinopterygii
- Order: Stomiiformes
- Family: Sternoptychidae
- Genus: Argyripnus
- Species: A. electronus

Binomial name
- Argyripnus electronus Parin, 1992

Species of fish

Argyripnus electronus is a species of ray-finned fish in the genus Argyripnus found in the Southeast Pacific.
