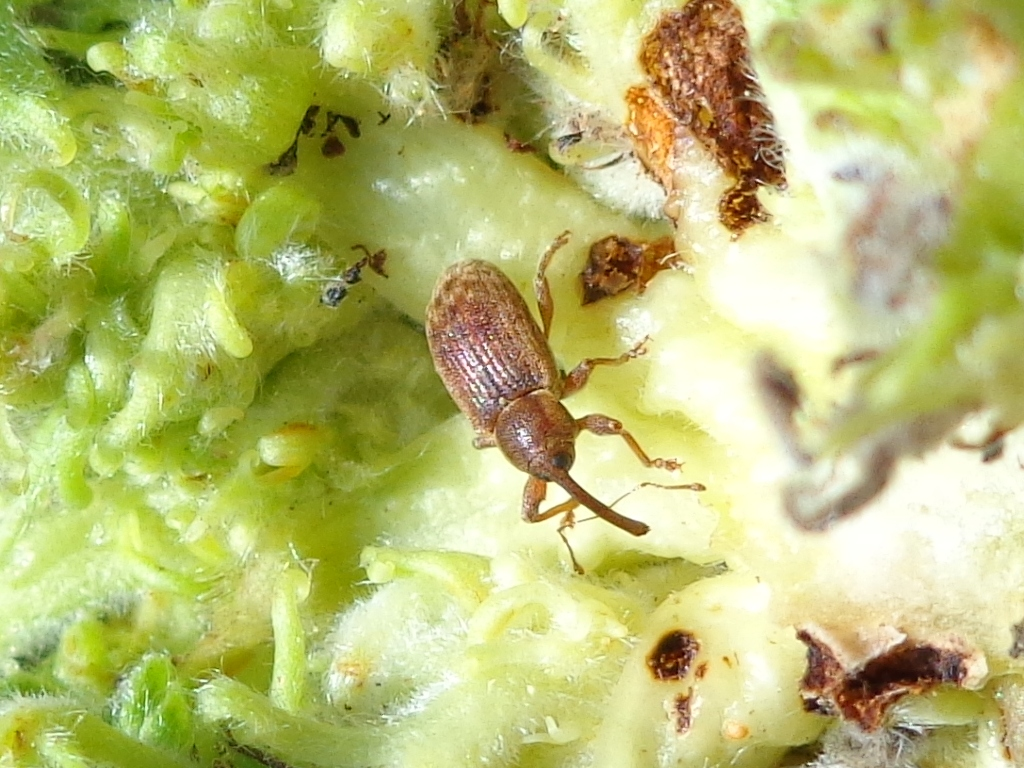
- Dorytomus rufatus Latvia

Scientific classification
- Domain: Eukaryota
- Kingdom: Animalia
- Phylum: Arthropoda
- Class: Insecta
- Order: Coleoptera
- Suborder: Polyphaga
- Infraorder: Cucujiformia
- Family: Curculionidae
- Genus: Dorytomus
- Species: D. rufatus

Binomial name
- Dorytomus rufatus (Bedel, 1888)

= Dorytomus rufatus =

Species of beetle

Dorytomus rufatus is a species of weevil native to Europe.
