= Lissonotus kuaiuba =

Scientific classification
- Kingdom: Animalia
- Phylum: Arthropoda
- Class: Insecta
- Order: Coleoptera
- Suborder: Polyphaga
- Infraorder: Cucujiformia
- Family: Cerambycidae
- Genus: Lissonotus
- Species: L. kuaiuba

Binomial name
- Lissonotus kuaiuba Martins & Galileo, 2004

Species of beetle

Lissonotus kuaiuba is a species of beetle in the family Cerambycidae. It was described by Martins and Galileo in 2004.
