= Lissonotus andalgalensis =

Scientific classification
- Kingdom: Animalia
- Phylum: Arthropoda
- Class: Insecta
- Order: Coleoptera
- Suborder: Polyphaga
- Infraorder: Cucujiformia
- Family: Cerambycidae
- Genus: Lissonotus
- Species: L. andalgalensis

Binomial name
- Lissonotus andalgalensis Bruch, 1908

Species of beetle

Lissonotus andalgalensis is a species of beetle in the family Cerambycidae. It was described by Bruch in 1908.
