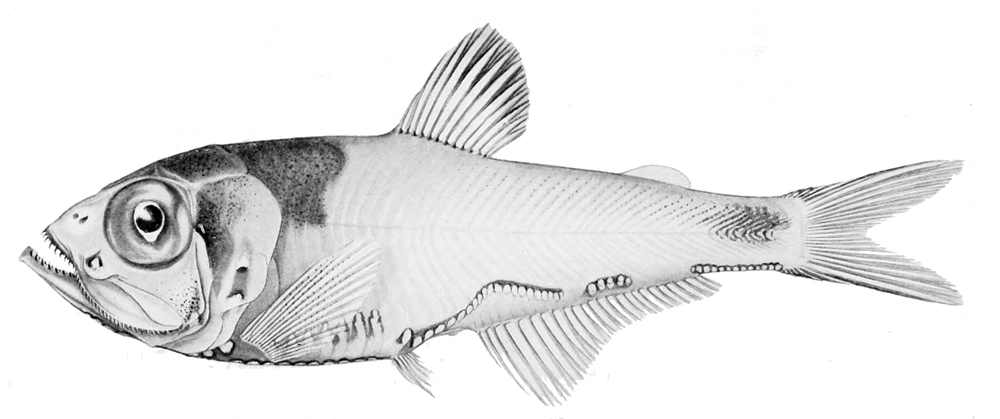
- Argyripnus iridescens

Scientific classification
- Domain: Eukaryota
- Kingdom: Animalia
- Phylum: Chordata
- Class: Actinopterygii
- Order: Stomiiformes
- Family: Sternoptychidae
- Genus: Argyripnus
- Species: A. iridescens

Binomial name
- Argyripnus iridescens McCulloch, 1926

= Argyripnus iridescens =

Species of fish

Argyripnus iridescens, also known as the pearlyside lightfish or brilliant pearlside, is a species of oceanic ray-finned fish in the genus Argyipnus. It lives in deep-water environments across the Southwest Pacific. Its max length is 14 cm (5.5 in).
