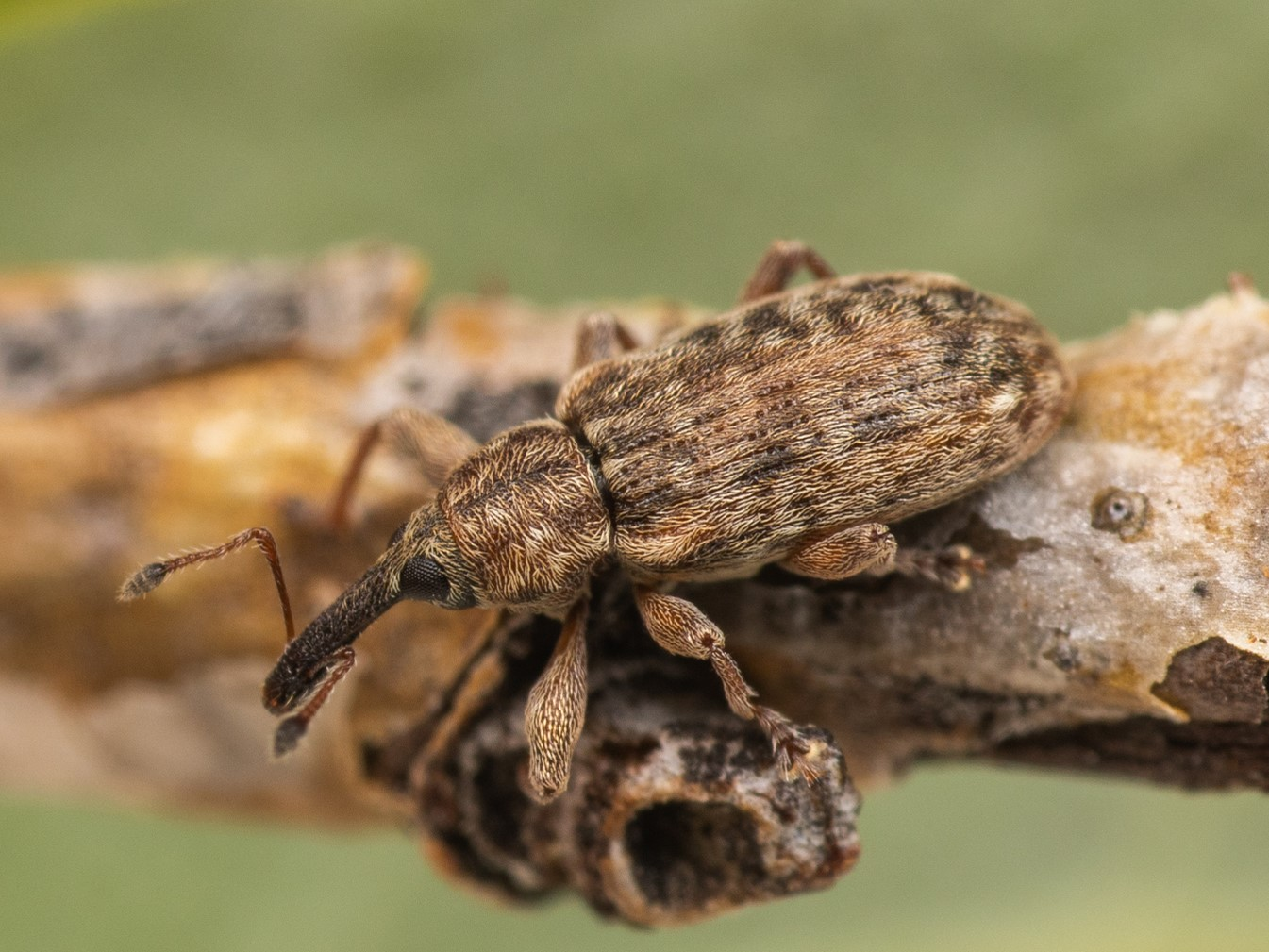

Scientific classification
- Domain: Eukaryota
- Kingdom: Animalia
- Phylum: Arthropoda
- Class: Insecta
- Order: Coleoptera
- Suborder: Polyphaga
- Infraorder: Cucujiformia
- Family: Curculionidae
- Genus: Dorytomus
- Species: D. leucophyllus

Binomial name
- Dorytomus leucophyllus (Motschulsky, 1845)

Synonyms
- Dorytomus adustus Motschulsky, 1860; Dorytomus bajulus Faust, 1890; Dorytomus longulus LeConte, 1876; Dorytomus tessellatus Motschulsky, 1860; Erirhinus subsignatus Mannerheim, 1853

= Dorytomus leucophyllus =

Species of beetle

Dorytomus leucophyllus is a species of true weevil in the beetle family Curculionidae. It is found in North America.
