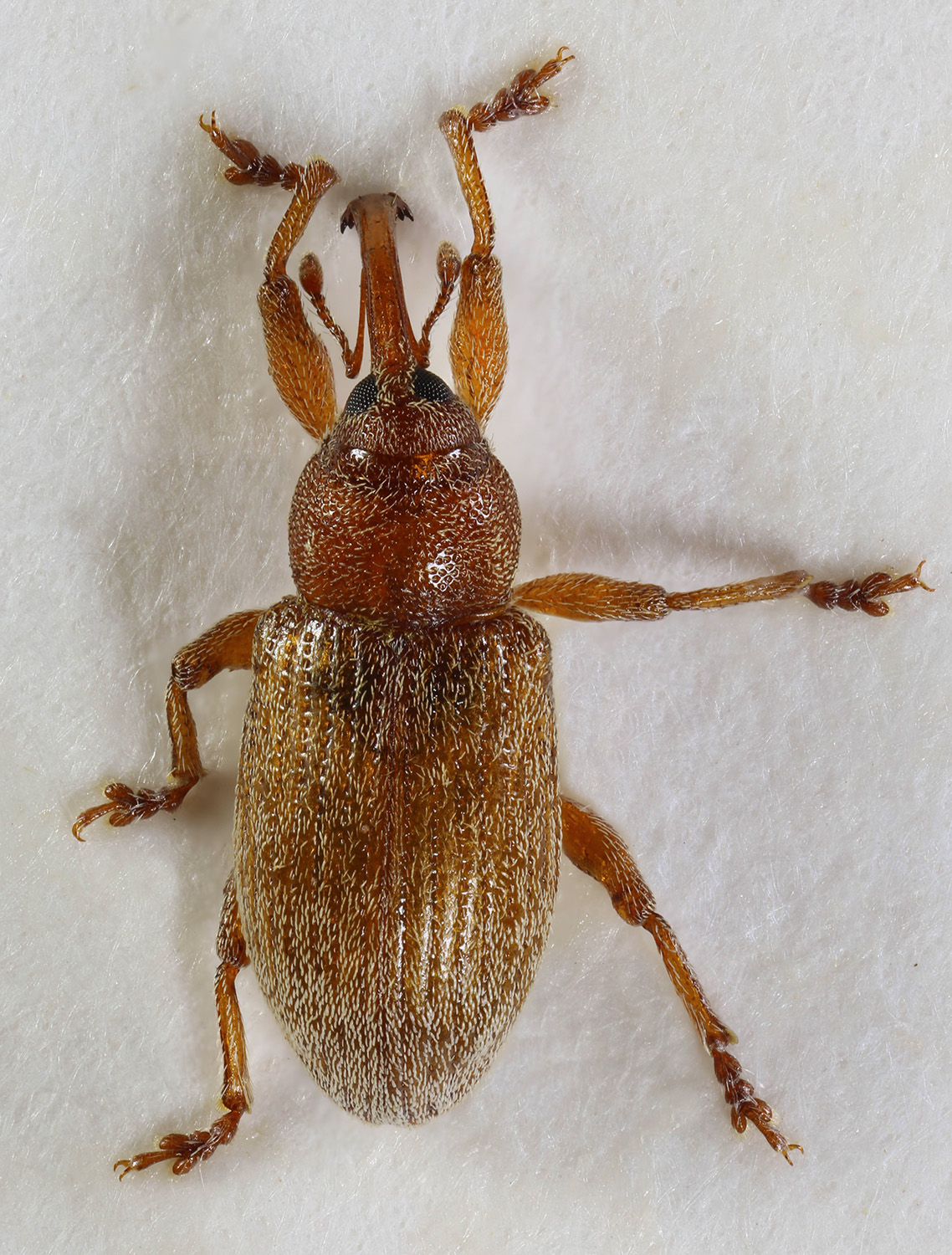
- Dorytomus melanophthalmus Gronant dunes, North Wales

Scientific classification
- Domain: Eukaryota
- Kingdom: Animalia
- Phylum: Arthropoda
- Class: Insecta
- Order: Coleoptera
- Suborder: Polyphaga
- Infraorder: Cucujiformia
- Family: Curculionidae
- Genus: Dorytomus
- Species: D. melanophthalmus

Binomial name
- Dorytomus melanophthalmus (Paykull, 1792)

= Dorytomus melanophthalmus =

Species of beetle

Dorytomus melanophthalmus is a species of weevil native to Europe.
