= Lissonotus rubidus =

Scientific classification
- Kingdom: Animalia
- Phylum: Arthropoda
- Class: Insecta
- Order: Coleoptera
- Suborder: Polyphaga
- Infraorder: Cucujiformia
- Family: Cerambycidae
- Genus: Lissonotus
- Species: L. rubidus

Binomial name
- Lissonotus rubidus White, 1853

Species of beetle

Lissonotus rubidus is a species of beetle in the family Cerambycidae. It was described by White in 1853.
