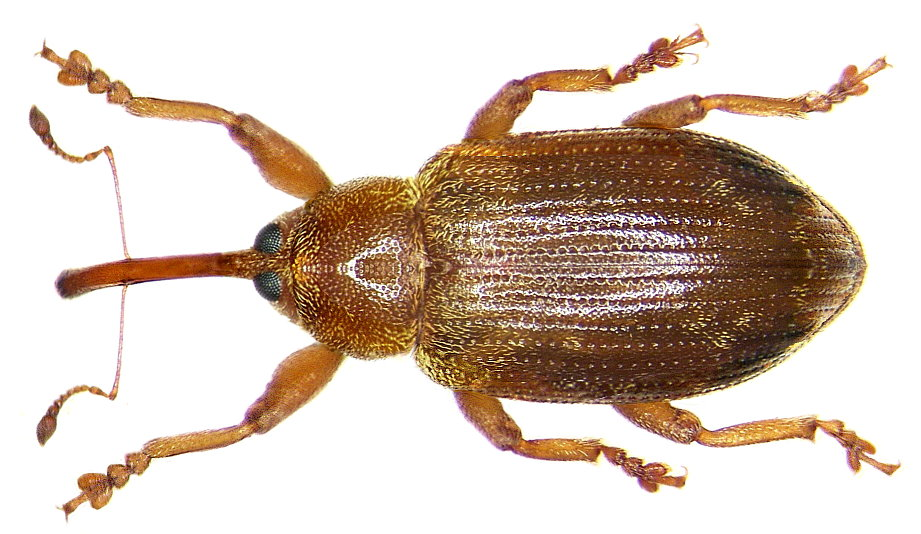

Scientific classification
- Kingdom: Animalia
- Phylum: Arthropoda
- Class: Insecta
- Order: Coleoptera
- Suborder: Polyphaga
- Infraorder: Cucujiformia
- Family: Curculionidae
- Genus: Dorytomus
- Species: D. tortrix

Binomial name
- Dorytomus tortrix (Linnaeus, 1761)

= Dorytomus tortrix =

Species of beetle

Dorytomus tortrix is a species of weevil native to Europe.
