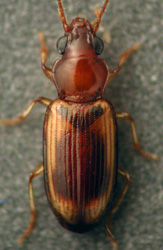

Scientific classification
- Kingdom: Animalia
- Phylum: Arthropoda
- Clade: Pancrustacea
- Class: Insecta
- Order: Coleoptera
- Suborder: Adephaga
- Family: Carabidae
- Genus: Pericompsus
- Species: P. laetulus

Binomial name
- Pericompsus laetulus LeConte, 1852

= Pericompsus laetulus =

Species of beetle

Pericompsus laetulus is a species of ground beetle in the family Carabidae. It is found in Central America and North America.
