= Argyripnus hulleyi =

Scientific classification
- Domain: Eukaryota
- Kingdom: Animalia
- Phylum: Chordata
- Class: Actinopterygii
- Order: Stomiiformes
- Family: Sternoptychidae
- Genus: Argyripnus
- Species: A. hulleyi

Binomial name
- Argyripnus hulleyi Quéro, Spitz & Vayne, 2009

Species of fish

Argyripnus hulleyi, commonly known as Reunion's bristle-mouth fish, is a species of ray-finned fish in the genus Argyripnus found in Reunion.

== Etymology ==
The fish is named in honor of Percy Alexander Hulley (b. 1941), the Curator of Fishes, at the Iziko South African Museum.
