= Argyripnus pharos =

Scientific classification
- Domain: Eukaryota
- Kingdom: Animalia
- Phylum: Chordata
- Class: Actinopterygii
- Order: Stomiiformes
- Family: Sternoptychidae
- Genus: Argyripnus
- Species: A. pharos

Binomial name
- Argyripnus pharos Harold & Lancaster, 2003

Species of fish

Argyripnus pharos is a species of ray-finned fish in the genus Argyripnus. It is found in the Indian Ocean and West Pacific.
