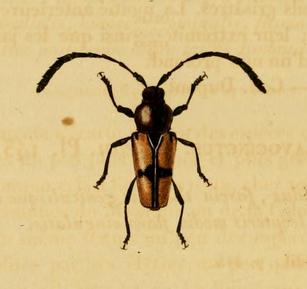

Scientific classification
- Kingdom: Animalia
- Phylum: Arthropoda
- Class: Insecta
- Order: Coleoptera
- Suborder: Polyphaga
- Infraorder: Cucujiformia
- Family: Cerambycidae
- Genus: Lissonotus
- Species: L. cruciatus

Binomial name
- Lissonotus cruciatus Dupont, 1836

= Lissonotus cruciatus =

Species of beetle

Lissonotus cruciatus is a species of beetle in the family Cerambycidae. It was described by Dupont in 1836.
