= Dorytomus luridus =

Scientific classification
- Kingdom: Animalia
- Phylum: Arthropoda
- Clade: Pancrustacea
- Class: Insecta
- Order: Coleoptera
- Suborder: Polyphaga
- Infraorder: Cucujiformia
- Family: Curculionidae
- Genus: Dorytomus
- Species: D. luridus

Binomial name
- Dorytomus luridus (Mannerheim, 1853)

Synonyms
- Dorytomus cuneatulus Casey, 1892

Species of beetle

Dorytomus luridus is a species of true weevil in the beetle family Curculionidae. It is found in North America.
