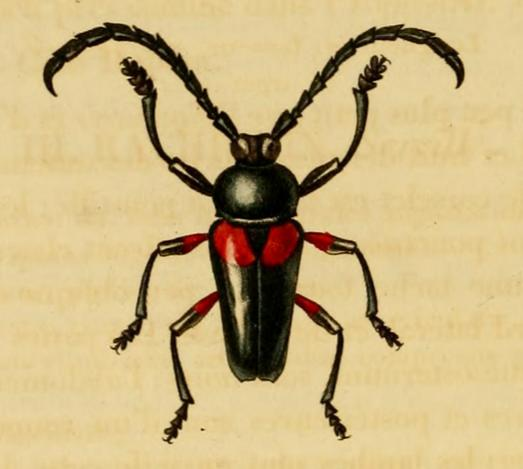

Scientific classification
- Kingdom: Animalia
- Phylum: Arthropoda
- Class: Insecta
- Order: Coleoptera
- Suborder: Polyphaga
- Infraorder: Cucujiformia
- Family: Cerambycidae
- Genus: Lissonotus
- Species: L. unifasciatus

Binomial name
- Lissonotus unifasciatus Gory in Guérin-Méneville, 1831

= Lissonotus unifasciatus =

Species of beetle

Lissonotus unifasciatus is a species of beetle in the family Cerambycidae. It was described by Gory in 1831.
