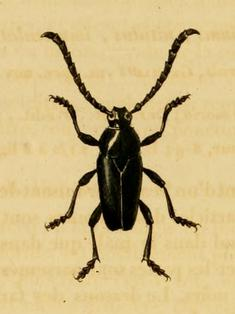

Scientific classification
- Kingdom: Animalia
- Phylum: Arthropoda
- Class: Insecta
- Order: Coleoptera
- Suborder: Polyphaga
- Infraorder: Cucujiformia
- Family: Cerambycidae
- Genus: Lissonotus
- Species: L. flabellicornis

Binomial name
- Lissonotus flabellicornis (Germar, 1824)

Synonyms
- Cerambyx (Lissonotus) flabellicornis Germar, 1824; Lissonotus flabellicornis Audinet-Serville, 1834

= Lissonotus flabellicornis =

Species of beetle

Lissonotus flabellicornis is a species of beetle in the family Cerambycidae. It was described by Ernst Friedrich Germar in 1824.
