= Dorytomus imbecillus =

Scientific classification
- Kingdom: Animalia
- Phylum: Arthropoda
- Clade: Pancrustacea
- Class: Insecta
- Order: Coleoptera
- Suborder: Polyphaga
- Infraorder: Cucujiformia
- Family: Curculionidae
- Genus: Dorytomus
- Species: D. imbecillus

Binomial name
- Dorytomus imbecillus Faust, 1882

Synonyms
- Dorytomus alaskanus Casey, 1892; Dorytomus subsimilis Blatchley, 1916

Species of beetle

Dorytomus imbecillus is a species of true weevil in the beetle family Curculionidae. It is found in North America.
