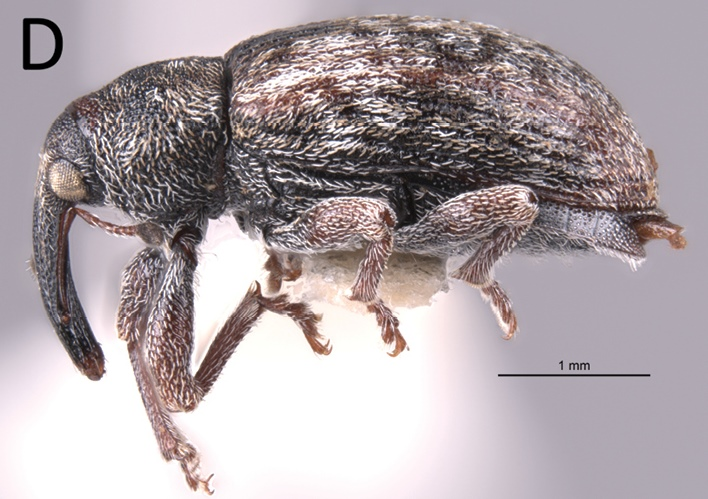
- Proctorus truncatus

Scientific classification
- Kingdom: Animalia
- Phylum: Arthropoda
- Class: Insecta
- Order: Coleoptera
- Suborder: Polyphaga
- Infraorder: Cucujiformia
- Family: Curculionidae
- Tribe: Ellescini
- Subtribe: Ellescina
- Genus: Proctorus; LeConte, 1876

= Proctorus =

Genus of beetles

Proctorus is a genus of true weevils in the beetle family Curculionidae. They are found in North America.

== Species ==
These four species belong to the genus Proctorus:

- Proctorus armatus LeConte, 1876
- Proctorus decipiens (LeConte, 1876)
- Proctorus emarginatus Lewis & Anderson, 2022
- Proctorus truncatus Lewis & Anderson, 2022
