= Argyripnus brocki =

Scientific classification
- Domain: Eukaryota
- Kingdom: Animalia
- Phylum: Chordata
- Class: Actinopterygii
- Order: Stomiiformes
- Family: Sternoptychidae
- Genus: Argyripnus
- Species: A. brocki

Binomial name
- Argyripnus brocki Struhsaker, 1973

Species of fish

Argyripnus brocki, commonly known as Brock's bristle-mouth fish, is a species of ray-finned fish in the genus Argyripnus found in the Pacific Ocean.

== Etymology ==
The fish is named in honor of Vernon E. Brock (1912–1971), an ichthyologist/herpetologist, for his contributions to marine biology and his support of Struhsaker's studies of the Hawaiian bathyal fishes.

== Description ==
The fish is typically 60 mm - 70 mm, with females being longer than males. They appear mostly translucent, with a small black patch sometimes being visible near the head.
