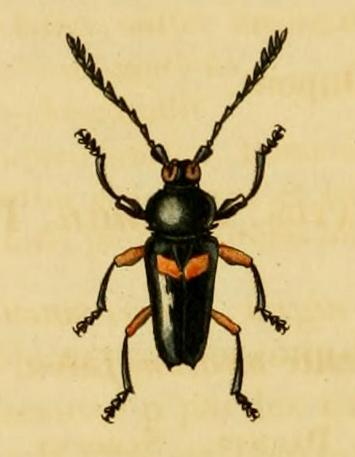

Scientific classification
- Kingdom: Animalia
- Phylum: Arthropoda
- Class: Insecta
- Order: Coleoptera
- Suborder: Polyphaga
- Infraorder: Cucujiformia
- Family: Cerambycidae
- Genus: Lissonotus
- Species: L. bisignatus

Binomial name
- Lissonotus bisignatus Dupont, 1836

= Lissonotus bisignatus =

Species of beetle

Lissonotus bisignatus is a species of beetle in the family Cerambycidae. It was described by Dupont in 1836.
