= Dorytomus rufus =

Scientific classification
- Domain: Eukaryota
- Kingdom: Animalia
- Phylum: Arthropoda
- Class: Insecta
- Order: Coleoptera
- Suborder: Polyphaga
- Infraorder: Cucujiformia
- Family: Curculionidae
- Genus: Dorytomus
- Species: D. rufus

Binomial name
- Dorytomus rufus (Say, 1832)

Synonyms
- Anthonomus tessellatus Walsh, 1867; Dorytomus squamosus LeConte, 1876; Elleschus angustatus Dietz, 1891

Species of beetle

Dorytomus rufus is a species of true weevil in the beetle family Curculionidae found in North America.
