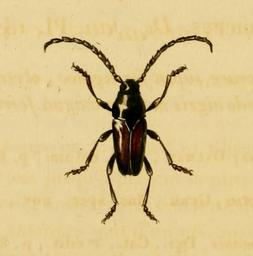

Scientific classification
- Kingdom: Animalia
- Phylum: Arthropoda
- Clade: Pancrustacea
- Class: Insecta
- Order: Coleoptera
- Suborder: Polyphaga
- Infraorder: Cucujiformia
- Family: Cerambycidae
- Genus: Lissonotus
- Species: L. spadiceus

Binomial name
- Lissonotus spadiceus Dalman, 1823

= Lissonotus spadiceus =

Species of beetle

Lissonotus spadiceus is a species of beetle in the family Cerambycidae. It was described by Dalman in 1823. It is found in Brazil (Goiás, Bahia, Minas Gerais, Distrito Federal, Espírito Santo, Rio de Janeiro, São Paulo, Paraná, Santa Catarina, Rio Grande do Sul), Paraguay and Argentina (Misiones).
