= Dorytomus frostii =

Scientific classification
- Domain: Eukaryota
- Kingdom: Animalia
- Phylum: Arthropoda
- Class: Insecta
- Order: Coleoptera
- Suborder: Polyphaga
- Infraorder: Cucujiformia
- Family: Curculionidae
- Genus: Dorytomus
- Species: D. frostii

Binomial name
- Dorytomus frostii Blatchley, 1916

Species of beetle

Dorytomus frostii is a species of true weevil in the beetle family Curculionidae. It is found in North America.
