= Dorytomus brevicollis =

Scientific classification
- Kingdom: Animalia
- Phylum: Arthropoda
- Class: Insecta
- Order: Coleoptera
- Suborder: Polyphaga
- Infraorder: Cucujiformia
- Family: Curculionidae
- Genus: Dorytomus
- Species: D. brevicollis

Binomial name
- Dorytomus brevicollis LeConte, 1876

Synonyms
- Alycodes dubius Deitz, 1891; Dorytomus fusciceps Casey, 1892; Dorytomus indifferens Casey, 1892

Species of beetle

Dorytomus brevicollis is a species of true weevil in the beetle family Curculionidae. It is found in North America.
