= Lissonotus rugosus =

Scientific classification
- Kingdom: Animalia
- Phylum: Arthropoda
- Class: Insecta
- Order: Coleoptera
- Suborder: Polyphaga
- Infraorder: Cucujiformia
- Family: Cerambycidae
- Genus: Lissonotus
- Species: L. rugosus

Binomial name
- Lissonotus rugosus E. Fuchs, 1958

Species of beetle

Lissonotus rugosus is a species of beetle in the family Cerambycidae. It was described by Ernst Fuchs in 1958.
