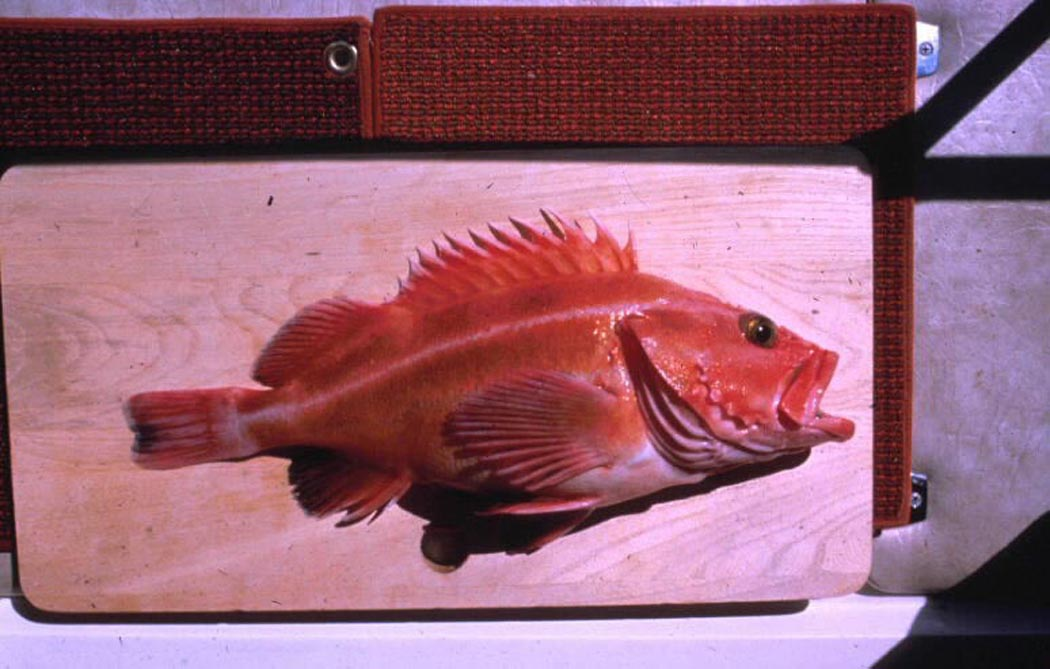
- This image is a yelloweye rockfish, Sebastes rubberimus

Scientific classification
- Kingdom: Animalia
- Phylum: Chordata
- Class: Actinopterygii
- Division: Teleostei
- Order: Perciformes
- Family: Scorpaenidae
- Genus: Sebastes
- Species: S. reedi

Binomial name
- Sebastes reedi (Westrheim & Tsuyuki, 1967)

Synonyms
- Sebastodes reedi Westrheim & Tsuyuki, 1967

= Sebastes reedi =

Species of fish

Sebastes reedi the yellowmouth rockfish, is a species of marine ray-finned fish belonging to the subfamily Sebastinae, the rockfishes, part of the family Scorpaenidae. It is found in the Eastern Pacific.

== Species information ==
Sebastes reedi was first formally described in 1967 as Sebastodes reedi by the fisheries scientists Sigurd Jergen Westrheim and Henry Tsuyuki with the type locality given as “10 miles west of Cape Palmerston off northwestern Vancouver Island”. The affinities of the yellowmouth rockfish within the genus Sebastes are uncertain and it is classified as incertae sedis within that genus. Out of over sixty species of rockfish found in the Pacific Ocean along North America, yellowmouth rockfish are one of over thirty-five species found along the coast of British Columbia. Its common name, yellowmouth rockfish, comes from the characteristic yellow markings found on the inside of its mouth, whereas its scientific name, Sebastes reedi, originally comes from Queen's University Professor G. B. Reed, the Fisheries Research Board of Canada's chairman from 1947 to 1953. Yellowmouth rockfish are also frequently referred to as "red snapper", "redeye", "reedi", and "rockcod". Yellowmouth rockfish are often confused with Pacific ocean perch, Sebastes alutus. Both species are so similar that, before the 1970s, they were interchangeably referred to as "red rockfish" or "ocean perch".

== Description and size ==
The inside of the mouth has yellow, black, and red blotches, which make yellowmouth rockfish distinguishable from other rockfish. The mouth itself is pinkish white. The body of adults is primarily red, with a mix of orange and yellow. Black mottling on the dorsal side is also present in smaller rockfish of less than 40 cm. The head has three distinct dark bands. The lateral line sports a thin pink-red line down its length. The peritoneum is silver with black dots. The lower jaw is long and has a moderate to small symphyseal knob. Individuals have thirteen dorsal and three anal spines. The mean weight of yellowmouth rockfish is 1.467 kg. Yellowmouth rockfish have been known to live up to 99 years, and reach a maximum length of 54 to 60 cm.

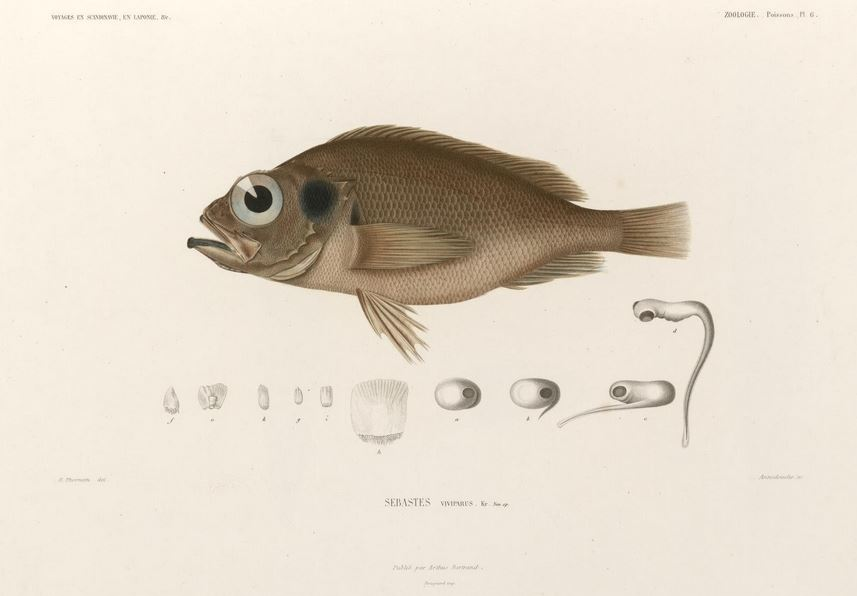
Sebastes viviparous reproduction

== Distribution and habitat ==
Yellowmouth rockfish are an east Pacific saltwater species that range from the Gulf of Alaska to San Francisco, California, and are commonly found from southeast Alaska to Oregon. Yellowmouth rockfish are widely distributed along the west coast of Canada, with highest densities in Queen Charlotte Sound. Yellowmouth rockfish are estimated to inhabit 11,000 to 34,000 of the estimated 48,000 square kilometers of potential habitat available to them in Canada. Yellowmouth rockfish occur along the continental slope at depths of 100 to 431 meters, with a preferred range of 180 to 275 meters. Juvenile yellowmouth rockfish are pelagic whereas adult yellowmouth rockfish are benthic and are frequently found inhabiting hard substrates such as bedrock and gravel.

== Biology ==
Yellowmouth rockfish are viviparous. In British Columbia, fertilization events occur in February and females bear live young from early spring through June. Immature yellowmouth rockfish are pelagic for up to one year. During the pelagic stage, immature yellowmouth rockfish larvae mature into juveniles, and then into adults. Juvenile yellowmouth rockfish are vulnerable to predation by other fish, such as Pacific Hake and Chinook Salmon, as well as by seabirds. Once they reach adulthood, yellowmouth rockfish become benthic and settle on rocky substrates along the ocean floor. Yellowmouth rockfish achieve 50% maturation when the average lengths of females and males average 38 and 37 cm, respectively. On average, it takes them 10 years to reach these lengths. Yellowmouth rockfish are slow-growing, and have a generation time of 30 years.

== Interspecific interactions ==
Yellowmouth rockfish are social, and are typically found in multispecies complexes. In British Columbia, yellowmouth rockfish are frequently caught along with Pacific Ocean perch, arrowtooth flounder, and redstripe rockfish. Deepwater uellowmouth rockfish assemblages along the west coast of the US and the Gulf of Alaska typically consist of a variety of rockfish species, including chilipepper and darkblotched rockfish.

== Commercial importance ==
Yellowmouth rockfish support the third largest rockfish fishery in British Columbia, after Pacific Ocean perch and yellowtail rockfish, with an annual total allowable catch of 2,444 t. From 2007 to 2008, the total Canadian catch of yellowmouth rockfish was valued at $1.5 million. Bottom and midwater trawlers are the preferential method used to catch this species.

== Threats ==
The primary threat to yellowmouth rockfish is commercial fishing. Bottom trawling is the preferred method of catching yellowmouth rockfish along the continental slope in British Columbia, and very little of this area receives habitat protection. In 2006, the Seafood Watch Program of Monterey Bay Aquarium classified all slope rockfish as high conservation concern and inherently vulnerable. In 2010, the Committee on the Status of Endangered Wildlife in Canada officially declared yellowmouth rockfish along the Pacific coast of Canada as threatened. Rockfish traits of slow growth, delayed maturity, and longevity make them vulnerable to overfishing, habitat loss from bottom trawling, and environmental change.

Yellowmouth rockfish are susceptible to infection by common marine fish pathogens. Out of the yellowmouth rockfish surveyed for pathogens off of the coast of Oregon in 2001, 10% were found to be infected with Ichthyophonus and 2% with Mycobacterium. The spleens and kidneys of rockfish infected with these pathogens contained multiple, discrete nodules of cartilaginous metaplasia.

Like other rockfish, yellowmouth rockfish have swim bladders that are unable to adjust to rapid pressure changes. Consequently, yellowmouth rockfish are extremely vulnerable to injury when caught from deep water, and bycatch mortality for most rockfish species is close to 100%.
