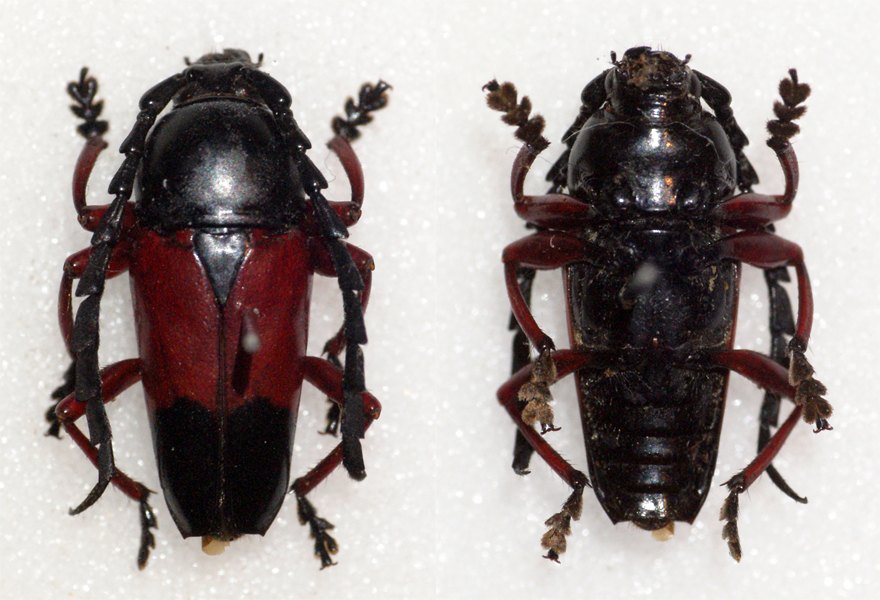
- Lissonotus corallinus

Scientific classification
- Kingdom: Animalia
- Phylum: Arthropoda
- Clade: Pancrustacea
- Class: Insecta
- Order: Coleoptera
- Suborder: Polyphaga
- Infraorder: Cucujiformia
- Family: Cerambycidae
- Subfamily: Cerambycinae
- Tribe: Lissonotini; Thomson, 1860
- Genus: Lissonotus; Dalman in Schoenherr, 1817

= Lissonotus =

Tribe of beetles

Lissonotini is a tribe of beetles in the subfamily Cerambycinae, containing a single genus, Lissonotus, and the following species:

- Lissonotus andalgalensis Bruch, 1908
- Lissonotus biguttatus Dalman in Schoenherr, 1817
- Lissonotus bisignatus Dupont, 1836
- Lissonotus confinis Aurivillius, 1915
- Lissonotus corallinus Dupont, 1836
- Lissonotus cruciatus Dupont, 1836
- Lissonotus ephippiatus Bates, 1870
- Lissonotus equestris Fabricius, 1787
- Lissonotus fallax Bates, 1870
- Lissonotus flabellicornis Germar, 1824
- Lissonotus flavocinctus Dupont, 1836
- Lissonotus kuaiuba Martins & Galileo, 2004
- Lissonotus nigrofasciatus Aurivillius, 1925
- Lissonotus princeps Bates, 1870
- Lissonotus rubidus White, 1853
- Lissonotus rubripes Tippmann, 1960
- Lissonotus rugosus Fuchs, 1958
- Lissonotus simplex Bates, 1870
- Lissonotus spadiceus Dalman, 1823
- Lissonotus unifasciatus Gory in Guérin-Méneville, 1831
- Lissonotus zellibori Tippmann, 1953
