= Pericompsus ephippiatus =

Scientific classification
- Domain: Eukaryota
- Kingdom: Animalia
- Phylum: Arthropoda
- Class: Insecta
- Order: Coleoptera
- Suborder: Adephaga
- Family: Carabidae
- Genus: Pericompsus
- Species: P. ephippiatus

Binomial name
- Pericompsus ephippiatus (Say, 1830)

Species of beetle

Pericompsus ephippiatus is a species of ground beetle in the family Carabidae. It is found in Central America and North America.
