= Ellescus ephippiatus =

Scientific classification
- Domain: Eukaryota
- Kingdom: Animalia
- Phylum: Arthropoda
- Class: Insecta
- Order: Coleoptera
- Suborder: Polyphaga
- Infraorder: Cucujiformia
- Family: Curculionidae
- Genus: Ellescus
- Species: E. ephippiatus

Binomial name
- Ellescus ephippiatus (Say, 1832)

Synonyms
- Elleschus californicus Casey, 1885

Species of beetle

Ellescus ephippiatus is a species of true weevil in the beetle family Curculionidae. It is found in North America.
