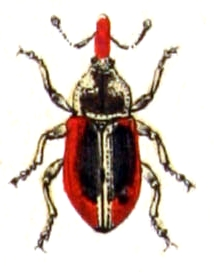
- Ellescus scanicus

Scientific classification
- Kingdom: Animalia
- Phylum: Arthropoda
- Class: Insecta
- Order: Coleoptera
- Suborder: Polyphaga
- Infraorder: Cucujiformia
- Family: Curculionidae
- Subtribe: Ellescina
- Genus: Ellescus; Dejean, 1821

= Ellescus =

Genus of beetles

Ellescus is a genus of true weevils in the beetle family Curculionidae. There are about 16 described species in Ellescus.

== Species ==
These 16 species belong to the genus Ellescus:

- Ellescus aurifer Sturm, 1826
- Ellescus bicolor Dejean, 1821
- Ellescus bipunctatus (Linnaeus, 1758)
- Ellescus borealis (Carr, 1920)
- Ellescus brevirostris Desbrochers, 1874
- Ellescus carpini Dejean, 1821
- Ellescus conspersus Chevrolat
- Ellescus ephippiatus (Say, 1831)
- Ellescus flavicans Dejean, 1821
- Ellescus infirmus (Herbst & J.F.W., 1795)
- Ellescus mongolicus Kuska, 1982
- Ellescus rubicundus Ziegler
- Ellescus rufus Dejean, 1821
- Ellescus scanicus (Paykull, 1792)
- Ellescus sericeus Dejean, 1821
- Ellescus variegatus Dejean, 1821
