= Frank Cramer =

American writer, biologist and educator

Frank Cramer (b. Wausau, Wisconsin November 4, 1861, d. Santa Clara County, California January 30, 1948) was an American writer, biologist and educator.

Cramer was born on November 4, 1861, in Wausau, Wisconsin. He attended Lawrence College in Appleton, Wisconsin, from where he graduated in 1886. He was then employed as a teacher in Wisconsin before going on to attend Stanford University in Palo Alto. At Stanford he studied zoology, graduating with a master's degree in 1893. He was influenced by David Starr Jordan to found a College-preparatory school for Stanford University, opening in 1891. The school was called the Palo Alto Preparatory School for Boys for a short period, until in 1893 it was renamed Manzanita Hall. 24 students were enrolled into the school by September 1894. Cramer remained there as head of school between 1893 and 1902 when he sold it to Dixon Lee. He was one of Palo Alto's first residents and was one of Palo Alto's early leaders in local government and education. He was on Palo Alto's first board of trustees, and in 1904 he won an election to the local school board for a three-year term. He was interested in natural history throughout his life, and had cooperateded with Jordan as a biologist on different projects. Cramer worked for the Palo Alto City Assessor's Office from 1926 up to his retirement in 1937. Cramer died on January 30, 1948, at the age of 86. Cramer was interred at the Alta Mesa Memorial Park in Palo Alto.

== Works ==
Cramer was the author of a number of publications and these include:

- On the cranial characters of the genus Sebastodes (rock-fish), 1895
- The method of Darwin: a study in scientific method A. C. McClurg and company, Chicago 1896
- Talks to students on the art of study Hoffman-Edwards, San Francisco 1902
- Moral training in the public schools; the California Prize essays Ginn & Co., 1907
- The case of the people against the lawyers and the courts; interviews with an outdoor philosopher, 1915

== Eponymy ==
Cramer is honored in the specific names of the following taxa:

- Sebastes crameri (Jordan 1897)
- Oregonichthys crameri (Snyder, 1908)
