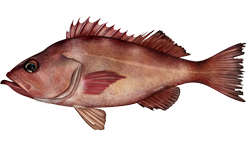

Scientific classification
- Kingdom: Animalia
- Phylum: Chordata
- Class: Actinopterygii
- Order: Perciformes
- Family: Scorpaenidae
- Genus: Sebastes
- Species: S. alutus

Binomial name
- Sebastes alutus (C. H. Gilbert, 1890)

Synonyms
- Sebastichthys alutus Gilbert, 1890 Sebastodes alutus (Gilbert, 1890)

= Pacific ocean perch =

Species of fish

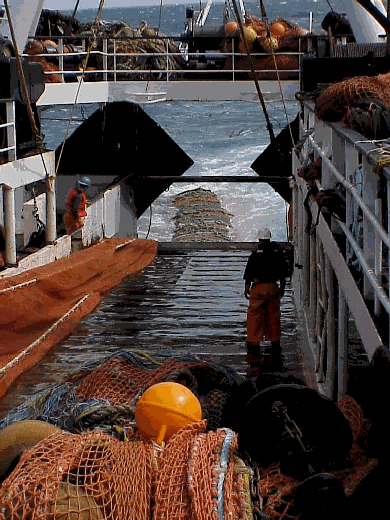
A 40-ton catch of Pacific ocean perch about to come on board

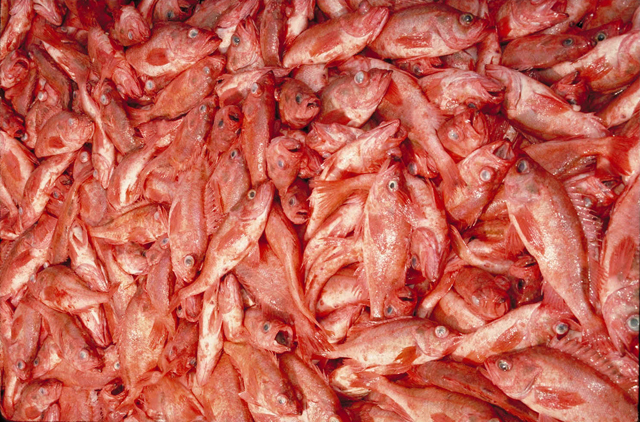
Rockfish eyes can bulge as a result of being brought up from great depths

The Pacific ocean perch (Sebastes alutus), also known as the Pacific rockfish, rose fish, red bream or red perch, is a fish whose range spans across the North Pacific : from southern California around the Pacific Rim to northern Honshū, Japan, including the Bering Sea. The species appears to be most abundant in northern British Columbia, the Gulf of Alaska, and the Aleutian Islands.

== Description ==
It has a compressed body type that tapers towards the tail. The adults can have a variable coloration from a deep red to a light red coloration, with dark markings near the back. They also tend to have a color gradient, going from a deep red from their back to a lighter red towards the stomach. They can grow up to 21.2 inches long and weigh up to 4.5 pounds. They have a large mouth with an extending lower jaw. From front to back, they have around thirteen dorsal fin spines and between 14 and 17 soft rays that create a round structure that ends where the tail begins. Their back fins are connected but tapered so that the sections are distinguishable. They also have three spines near the anus. Their tail fin shape is flat with a slight indent in the middle, making both sides of the fin symmetrical.

The larvae of Pacific ocean perch are challenging to identify and distinguish from other rockfish larvae because they all contain similar developmental characteristics. However, genetic techniques can identify larvae and juveniles. Older juveniles were relatively less challenging to locate as they displayed identical coloration to the adults and showed a protrusible lower jaw that extended further out than the upper jaw. In general, the larvae can grow between 4 and 6.5mm in length and have pectoral fins that extend to the back of their anus.

The Acadian redfish is a fish with characteristics similar to the Pacific ocean perch. Like the Pacific ocean perch, the Acadian redfish has red pigmentation and generally similar fin patterns as the Pacific ocean perch. However, unlike the Pacific ocean perch, the Acadian redfish has orange blotches along its back instead of an olive-green coloration. Likewise, their habitats are different as the Acadian redfish is found in the Northwest Atlantic Ocean, and the Pacific ocean perch is found in the Pacific Ocean.

== Taxonomy ==
The Pacific ocean perch was first formally described as Sebastichthys alutus in 1890 by the American ichthyologist Charles Henry Gilbert with the type locality given as the Santa Barbara Islands off California. The specific name alutus means "unwashed" thought to be an allusion to the dusky color with dark blotches along the back. The Pacific ocean perch is part of the Teleostei class. They are classified in the superorder Accanthopterygii. Despite what their name implies, they are not part of the Perch order. Instead, they are part of the Scorpaeniformes order, which includes scorpion fish, lionfish, and stonefishes. All the fishes within this family contain venom in their spines, which are used for hunting and self-defense. However, the spines on the Pacific ocean perch do not have poison. Some authorities place this species in the subgenus Acutomentum. Within the Scorpanidae family, they are part of the Sebastes genus.

== Distribution and habitat ==
The Pacific ocean perch is found in the North Pacific Ocean where its range extends from Honshu in Japan to Cape Navarin in the Bering Sea, although they are absent from the Sea of Okhotsk, through the Aleutian Islands from Stalemate Bank to Bowers Bank and south along the west coast of North America as far as La Jolla in California.

As they grow, they migrate to deeper depths until they can migrate into a deepwater ecosystem further offshore. Adults are found primarily offshore on the outer continental shelf and the upper continental slope in depths 150–420 m. This is because the shelves contain a wider variety of temperatures and pressures in one area, and the Pacific ocean perch feeds along the water column at night in schools. Seasonal differences in depth distribution have been noted by many investigators. Adults inhabit shallower depths in the summer, especially those between 150 and 300 m. In the fall, the fish apparently migrate farther offshore to depths of ~300–420 m. They reside in these deeper depths until about May, when they return to their shallower summer distribution. Researchers found that Pacific ocean perch prefer a temperature range from 4 °C to 7 °C and their movement patterns are linked to coastal wind patterns.

This seasonal pattern is probably related to summer feeding and winter spawning. Although small numbers of Pacific ocean perch are dispersed throughout their preferred depth range on the continental shelf and slope, most of the population occurs in patchy, localized aggregations. Pacific ocean perch are generally considered to be semi-demersal but there can at times be a significant pelagic component to their distribution. Pacific ocean perch often move off-bottom at night to feed, apparently following diel euphausiid migrations. Commercial fishing data in the Gulf of Alaska since 1995 show that pelagic trawls fished off-bottom have accounted for as much as 20% of the annual harvest of this species.

== Life history ==
There is much uncertainty about the life history of Pacific ocean perch, although generally more is known than for other rockfish species. The species appears to be viviparous (the eggs develop internally and receive at least some nourishment from the mother), with internal fertilization and the release of live young. Insemination occurs in the fall, and sperm are retained within the female until fertilization occurs ~2 months later. The eggs hatch internally, and parturition (release of larvae) occurs in April–May.

As larvae, Pacific ocean perch drift on the ocean's currents into the open sea until they have matured enough to develop fins. Once they've reached the juvenile stage of their life, they tend to live in rocky areas inshore and can be found on the surfaces of offshore waters for access to food and shelter from predators.

Information on early life history is very sparse, especially for the first year of life. Pacific ocean perch larvae are pelagic and drift with the current. Oceanic conditions may sometimes cause advection to suboptimal areas resulting in high recruitment variability. However, larval studies of rockfish have been hindered by difficulties in species identification since many larval rockfish species share the same morphological characteristics. Genetic techniques using allozymes and mitochondrial DNA are capable of identifying larvae and juveniles to species, but are expensive and time-consuming.

Post-larval and early young-of-the-year Pacific ocean perch have been positively identified in offshore, surface waters of the GOA, which suggests this may be the preferred habitat of this life stage. Transformation to a demersal existence may take place within the first year. Juvenile POP are found predominantly in mixed sand and boulder environments exclusively. They tend to hide in boulders, upright coral or sponges. Likewise, they tend to be found on shallower zones on the continental shelf. In 1976, using trawling techniques, researchers found that younger juveniles between ages 1 and 2 were over rougher substrate than older juveniles between the ages 3 and 4. Both age groups lived at shallower depths than adults. Lengths of juvenile perch varied between and within geographic areas, but the variation pattern was inconsistent. However, they can become bottom-dwelling fish as early as one year of age, which rejected earlier hypotheses which suggested that they had a 2-3 yearlong pelagic lifestyle. As they grow, they continue to migrate deeper, eventually reaching the continental slope, where they attain adulthood.

The ages and average sizes in which the Pacific ocean perch reaches sexual maturity 157 can differ. However, in 2013, research was conducted in the Gulf of Alaska that found 158 that the smallest mature fish was 30.8 cm tail length, and the largest immature fish was 159 40.0 cm tail length. The tail length at 50% maturity was calculated to be 33.4 cm. The 160 youngest mature fish was age 7, and the oldest immature fish was age 23.

Research that studied their reproductive seasonality near the Gulf of Alaska found that Pacific ocean perch ovary cells for females began to develop during the months of July through September. Advanced yolk formation in the oocytes occurred primarily between October and January and continued to increase in the oocytes until February. Embryos appeared within the ovaries during February and March, and egg development continued to April or May when parturition occurred.

There is also an increase in the size of the ovary through March, a decrease in May as egg laying occurs, and a sharp drop off in June after parturition (Figure 3). Around June and July, Pacific ocean perch begin the resting stage period for the oocytes.

The reproduction of this species was highly synchronous with a prolonged period of development from the onset of yolk formation in July and August to parturition in May. Yolk formation occurred during a 5- to 6-month period from July/August through December/January; this was followed by embryogenesis, which occurred during a 4- to 5-month period from December/January through May. The spent/resting period of Pacific ocean perch was very short, only about 2 months from the end of May through July, before yolk formation began again.

== Ecology ==
Pacific ocean perch are mostly planktivorous,. In a sample of 600 juvenile perch stomachs, found that juveniles fed on an equal mix of calanoid, copepods and krill. Larger juveniles and adults fed primarily on euphausiids, and to a lesser degree, copepods, amphipods and mysids. In the Aleutian Islands, myctophids have increasingly comprised a substantial portion of the Pacific ocean perch diet, which also compete for euphausiid prey. It has been suggested that Pacific ocean perch and walleye pollock compete for the same euphausiid prey. Consequently, the large removals of Pacific ocean perch by foreign fishermen in the Gulf of Alaska in the 1960s may have allowed walleye pollock stocks to expand in abundance greatly.

Predators of adult Pacific ocean perch are likely sablefish, Pacific halibut, and sperm whales. Juveniles are consumed by seabirds, other rockfish, salmon, lingcod, and other large demersal fish.

== Population ==
Pacific ocean perch is a very slow-growing species, with a low rate of natural mortality (estimated at 0.06), a relatively old age at 50% maturity (10.5 years for females in the Gulf of Alaska), and a very old maximum age of 98 years in Alaska (84 years maximum age in the Gulf of Alaska). Age at 50% recruitment to the commercial fishery has been estimated to be between 7 and 8 years in the Gulf of Alaska. Despite their viviparous nature, the fish is relatively fecund, with the number of eggs/female in Alaska ranging from 10,000 to 300,000, depending upon the size of the fish.

The evolutionary strategy of spreading reproductive output over many years ensures some reproductive success through long periods of poor larval survival. Fishing generally selectively removes the older and faster-growing portion of the population. If there is a distinct evolutionary advantage of retaining the oldest fish in the population, either because of higher fecundity or because of different spawning times, age-truncation could be ruinous to a population with highly episodic recruitment like rockfish. Recent work on black rockfish (Sebastes melanops) has shown that larval survival may be dramatically higher from older female spawners The black rockfish population has shown a distinct downward trend in age-structure in recent fishery samples off the West Coast of North America, raising concerns about whether these are general results for most rockfish. Studies of this species and the rougheye rockfish (S. aleutianus) for senescence in reproductive activity of older fish and found that oogenesis continues at advanced ages. It has been shown that older individuals have slightly higher egg dry weight than their middle-aged counterparts. Such relationships have not yet been determined to exist for Pacific ocean perch or other rockfish in Alaska.

Few studies have been conducted on the stock structure of Pacific ocean perch. Based on allozyme variation, and Pacific ocean perch are genetically quite similar throughout their range, and genetic exchange may be the result of dispersion at early life stages. In contrast, preliminary analysis using mitochondrial DNA techniques suggest that genetically distinct populations of Pacific ocean perch exist (A. J. Gharrett pers. commun., University of Alaska Fairbanks, October 2000). It has been found that there are distinct genetic populations on a small scale in British Columbia. Currently, genetic studies are underway that should clarify the genetic stock structure of Pacific ocean perch.

== Commercial fishing ==
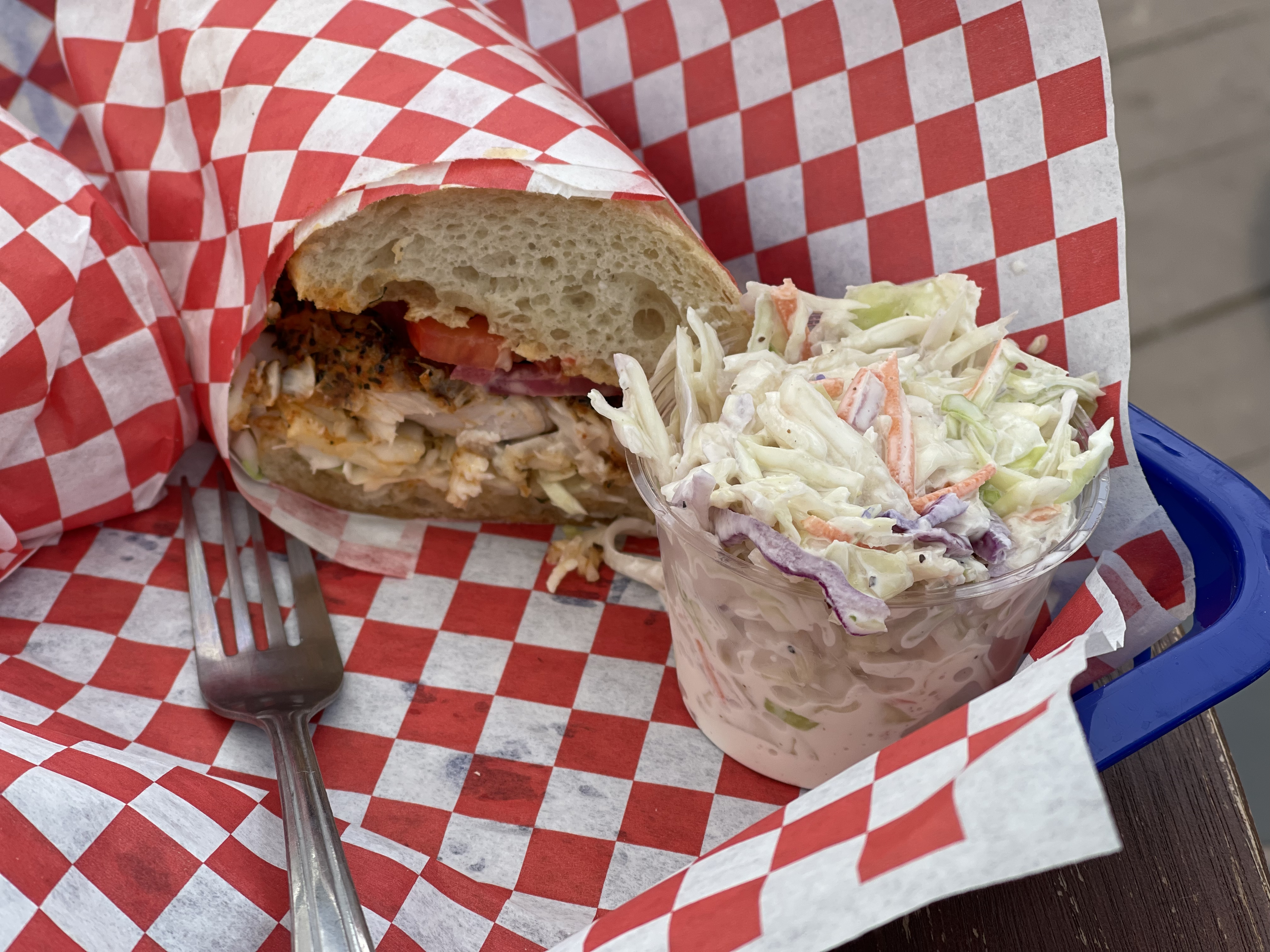
Rock cod sandwich at Princess Seafood in Fort Bragg, California. The rock cod was caught off the coast of Fort Bragg.

Global capture production of Pacific ocean perch (Sebastes alutus) in thousand tonnes from 1950 to 2022, as reported by the FAO

The fishery for Pacific ocean perch developed nearly synchronously from the U.S. West Coast to the Bering Sea. Prior to 1965, the Pacific ocean perch resource in the US Vancouver and Columbia areas of the INPFC were harvested almost entirely by Canadian and United States vessels. Most of the vessels were of multi-purpose design and used in other fisheries, such as salmon and herring, when not engaged in the groundfish fishery (Forrester et al. 1978). Generally, under 200 gross tons and less than 33 meters (m) in length, these vessels had very little at-sea processing capabilities. These restricted the distance these vessels could fish from home ports and limited the size of their landings. Landings from 1956 to 1965 averaged slightly over 2,000 metric tons (mt) in each of the two INPFC areas included in this assessment, with an overall increasing trend of catch over this period.

The Gulf of Alaska fishing history captures a typical catch history: A Pacific ocean perch trawl fishery by the U.S.S.R. and Japan began in the Gulf of Alaska in the early 1960s. This led the fishery to develop rapidly, with massive efforts by the Soviet and Japanese fleets. Catches peaked in 1965 when a total of nearly 350,000 metric tons (t) was caught. This apparent overfishing resulted in a precipitous decline in catches in the late 1960s. Catches continued to decline in the 1970s, and by 1978, catches were only 8,000 t. Foreign fishing dominated the fishery from 1977 to 1984, and catches generally declined. Most of the catch was taken by Japan. Catches reached a minimum in 1985, after foreign trawling in the Gulf of Alaska was prohibited. Although this species is the most abundant of the rockfishes in the North Pacific Ocean, like other Pacific members of the Sebastes genus, it faces significant fishing pressure due to its slow growth rate, delayed maturation age, low yearly population fecundity, and its habit of forming large schools, making them easier to catch.

In 1981, the Pacific Fishery Management Council (PFMC) adopted a 20-year plan to rebuild the depleted Pacific ocean perch (Sebastes alutus) population in waters off the Washington and Oregon coast. This plan was based on the results of two studies. The first study employed a cohort analysis of 1966-76 catch and age-composition data to examine various rebuilding schedules (Gunderson 1978). The second study evaluated alternative trip limits as a management tool for the Pacific ocean perch fishery (Tagart et al. 1980). Controls on catch of Pacific ocean perch, and assessments of this species off Washington and Oregon have continued to the present day. Conservative management measures, an excellent observer program, and perhaps higher productivity in Alaska have allowed the stock to recover to a level to allow about 26,000 tons per annum. The U.S. West Coast stock was declared rebuilt in 2017 after 17 years in a rebuilding plan.

Due to fishing regulations and many other conservation efforts, the Pacific ocean perch's conservation status is currently Not Extinct. They are currently managed by the Pacific Fishery Management Council (PFMC) and NOAA Fisheries under the Pacific Coast Groundfish Fishery Management Plan. The PFMC established a rebuilding plan in 2000 after considering POP overfished in 1999. The U.S. West Coast stock was declared rebuilt in 2017 after 17 years of a rebuilding plan. In 2015, Pacific ocean perch had reached 48% of its target population level. Aside from overfishing, it is unknown if any other threats to their population exist, including climate change or other anthropogenic impacts.

== Nutrition ==
Nutrition information for Pacific ocean perch is as follows.

Serving Size	100g
=== Calories ===	90 kcal
=== Protein ===	18.5 g
Protein calories: 79 kcal Protein calories % : 87.8%	
=== Fat ===	1.2 g
Fat calories: 11 kcal Fat calories % : 12.2%	
=== Carbohydrate ===	0.0 g
Carbohydrate calories: 0 kcal Carbohydrate calories % : 0.0%	
Cholesterol	68.3 mg
Sodium	49.8 mg

Serving Size	per 100g	per 100 kcal
Omega 3 (EPA+DHA)	429 mg	478 mg
Vitamin B3	2.8 mg	3.1 mg
Vitamin B6	0.2 mg	0.2 mg
Vitamin B12	2.8 mcg	3.1 mcg
Vitamin D	120 IU	134 IU
Vitamin E	0 mg	0 mg
Calcium	9.8 mg	10.9 mg
Magnesium	26.4 mg	29.4 mg
Phosphorus	193 mg	215 mg
Potassium	425 mg	474 mg
Selenium	60 mcg	67 mcg

== Other references ==
- Gulf of Alaska Pacific ocean perch stock assessment (2009)
- Bering Sea and Aleutian Islands Pacific ocean perch stock assessment (2008)
- Pacific ocean perch NOAA FishWatch. Retrieved 5 November 2012.
- Canadian Pacific ocean perch stock assessment (2001)
- U.S. West Coast Pacific ocean perch stock assessment (2009) Archived 3 March 2016 at the Wayback Machine
- NOAA's Alaska Fisheries Science Center
- "Sebastes alutus". Integrated Taxonomic Information System.
- Froese, Rainer; Pauly, Daniel (eds.). "Sebastes alutus". FishBase. May 2006 version.
