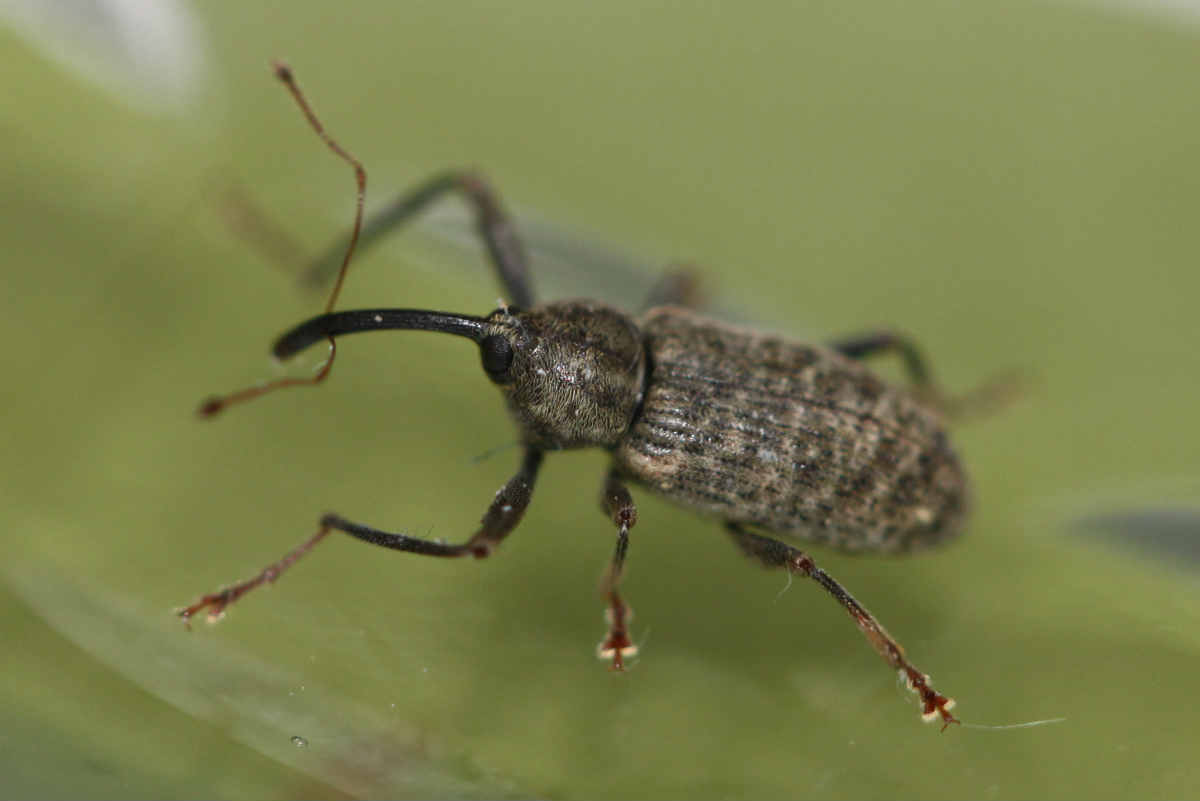
- Dorytomus longimanus

Scientific classification
- Domain: Eukaryota
- Kingdom: Animalia
- Phylum: Arthropoda
- Class: Insecta
- Order: Coleoptera
- Suborder: Polyphaga
- Infraorder: Cucujiformia
- Family: Curculionidae
- Tribe: Ellescini
- Genus: Dorytomus; Germar, 1817

Diversity
- at least 170 species

= Dorytomus =

Genus of beetles

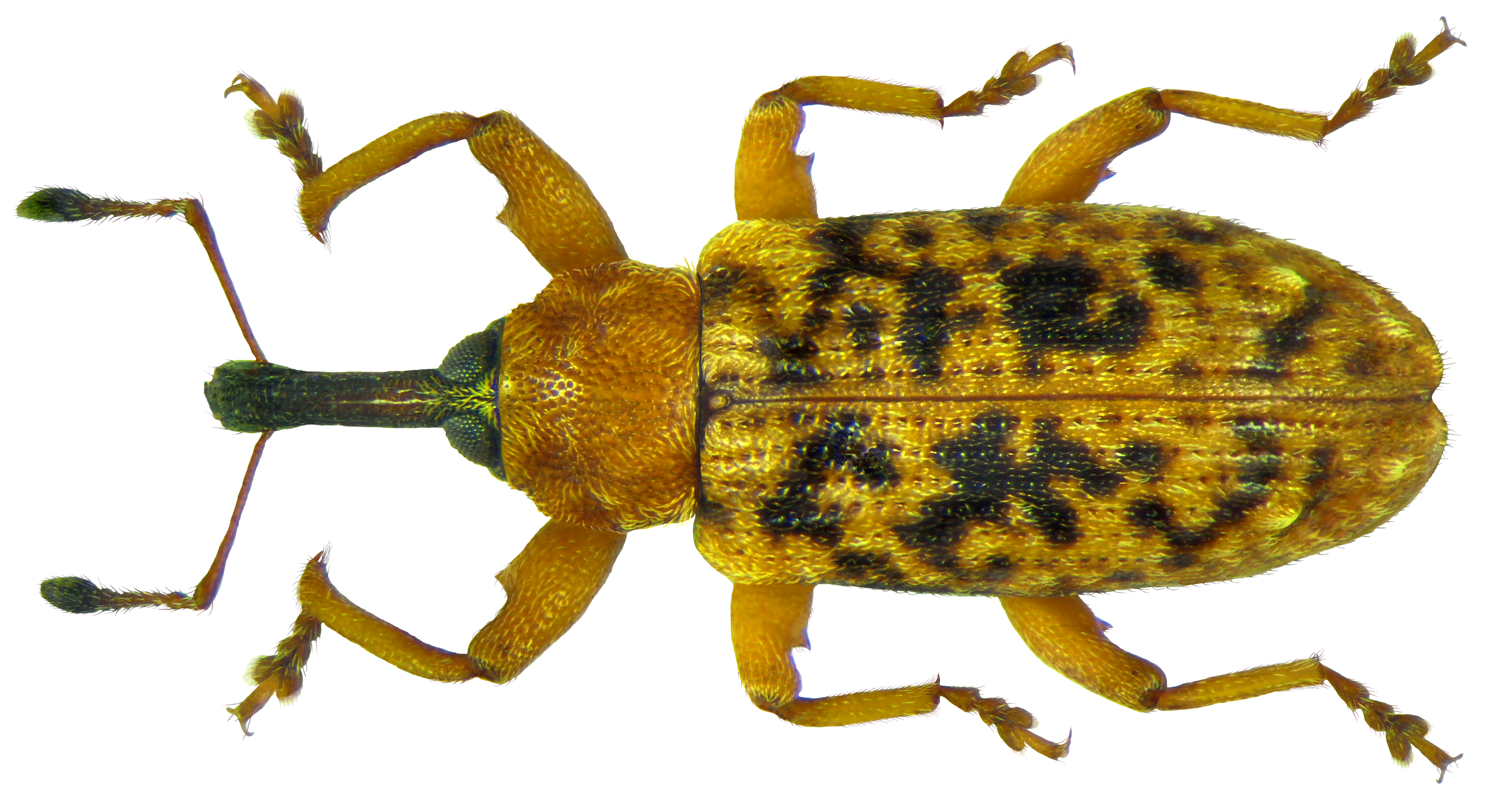
Dorytomus taeniatus

Dorytomus is a genus of weevils belonging the family Curculionidae and subfamily Curculioninae. It was first described by the German entomologist, Ernst Friedrich Germar in 1817.

== See also ==
- List of Dorytomus species
