= List of shoals of Oregon =

List of shoals of Oregon contains all natural river bars, sandbars, spits, and shoals identified by the USGS in the U.S. state of Oregon. The USGS defines a bar as a "natural accumulation of sand, gravel, or alluvium forming an underwater or exposed embankment (ledge, reef, sandbar, shoal, spit)".

Perhaps the best known is the Columbia Bar system which consists of several bars, including Peacock Spit and Clatsop Spit outside the jetties. Inside, in the Columbia River proper are Jetty Sands, Desdemona Sands, Baker Sands, Chinook Sands, Youngs River Sands, and Tongue Point Bar all near the mouth.

There are 156 bars listed as of December 12, 2008.

name	type	elevation	coordinate	USGS Map	GNIS ID
Tom Fry Eddy (Curry County, Oregon)	Bar	33 ft (10 m)	42°33′08″N 124°04′12″W	Agness	1155762
Walker Bar (Curry County, Oregon)	Bar	39 ft (12 m)	42°36′22″N 124°03′51″W	Agness	1155771
Agness Bar (Curry County, Oregon)	Bar	36 ft (11 m)	42°33′04″N 124°04′02″W	Agness	1155772
Lynch Bar (Curry County, Oregon)	Bar	58 ft (18 m)	42°30′09″N 124°02′10″W	Agness	1159186
Taylor Sands (Clatsop County, Oregon)	Bar	0 ft (0 m)	46°13′52″N 123°47′06″W	Astoria	1127911
Tongue Point Bar (Oregon)	Bar	0 ft (0 m)	46°13′31″N 123°46′04″W	Astoria	1128159
Upper Sands (Clatsop County, Oregon)	Bar	0 ft (0 m)	46°11′44″N 123°51′35″W	Astoria	1162784
Gardner Bar (Curry County, Oregon)	Bar	51 ft (16 m)	42°10′39″N 124°08′34″W	Bosley Butte	1154697
Miller Bar (Curry County, Oregon)	Bar	47 ft (14 m)	42°08′29″N 124°10′24″W	Bosley Butte	1154698
Fashion Reef (Multnomah County, Oregon)	Bar	6 ft (1.8 m)	45°34′50″N 122°07′59″W	Bridal Veil	1142028
Lobster Bar (Curry County, Oregon)	Bar	13 ft (4.0 m)	42°30′00″N 124°18′02″W	Brushy Bald Mountain	1155978
Black Bar (Josephine County, Oregon)	Bar	149 ft (45 m)	42°39′25″N 123°43′53″W	Bunker Creek	1117737
Tyee Bar (Josephine County, Oregon)	Bar	172 ft (52 m)	42°39′27″N 123°39′26″W	Bunker Creek	1160650
Dug Bar (Wallowa County, Oregon)	Bar	310 ft (94 m)	45°48′26″N 116°41′22″W	Cactus Mountain	1141380
One Reef (Clark County, Washington)	Bar	6 ft (1.8 m)	45°34′06″N 122°24′35″W	Camas	1507189
New Era Bar (Clackamas County, Oregon)	Bar	19 ft (5.8 m)	45°17′38″N 122°39′31″W	Canby	1124659
Horseshoe Bar (Grant County, Oregon)	Bar	1,020 ft (310 m)	44°21′57″N 118°57′19″W	Canyon Mountain	1160682
Lawson Bar (Douglas County, Oregon)	Bar	195 ft (59 m)	42°57′09″N 123°20′09″W	Canyonville	1157165
Simpson Reef (Coos County, Oregon)	Bar	0 ft (0 m)	43°18′58″N 124°24′19″W	Cape Arago	1126996
Blanco Reef (Curry County, Oregon)	Bar	0 ft (0 m)	42°49′44″N 124°35′10″W	Cape Blanco	1117803
Orford Reef (Curry County, Oregon)	Bar	0 ft (0 m)	42°47′06″N 124°36′53″W	Cape Blanco	1125040
Tituna Spit (Curry County, Oregon)	Bar	2 ft (0.61 m)	42°47′54″N 124°31′39″W	Cape Blanco	1135964
Seattle Bar (historical) (Jackson County, Oregon)	Bar	600 ft (180 m)	42°00′44″N 123°09′04″W	Carberry Creek	1155064
Puget Bar (historical) (Clatsop County, Oregon)	Bar	0 ft (0 m)	46°12′12″N 123°26′09″W	Cathlamet	1851730
Mussel Reef (Coos County, Oregon)	Bar	0 ft (0 m)	43°20′44″N 124°21′47″W	Charleston	1161453
Allison Bar (Yamhill County, Oregon)	Bar	28 ft (8.5 m)	45°08′02″N 123°00′49″W	Dayton	1116882
Brentano Bar (Yamhill County, Oregon)	Bar	29 ft (8.8 m)	45°13′28″N 123°01′37″W	Dayton	1118055
Candiani Bar (Marion County, Oregon)	Bar	24 ft (7.3 m)	45°12′36″N 123°03′05″W	Dayton	1118558
Duke Bar (Yamhill County, Oregon)	Bar	25 ft (7.6 m)	45°08′38″N 123°01′55″W	Dayton	1120206
Fairfield Bar (Marion County, Oregon)	Bar	54 ft (16 m)	45°08′18″N 123°00′54″W	Dayton	1120559
Five Islands Bar (Yamhill County, Oregon)	Bar	23 ft (7.0 m)	45°11′01″N 123°01′04″W	Dayton	1120802
Lower Lambert Bar (Yamhill County, Oregon)	Bar	24 ft (7.3 m)	45°09′37″N 123°00′47″W	Dayton	1123569
Upper Lambert Bar (Yamhill County, Oregon)	Bar	25 ft (7.6 m)	45°09′32″N 123°01′58″W	Dayton	1128459
Weston Bar (Yamhill County, Oregon)	Bar	23 ft (7.0 m)	45°12′04″N 123°01′27″W	Dayton	1128920
Coffee Island Bar (Yamhill County, Oregon)	Bar	23 ft (7.0 m)	45°11′26″N 123°01′13″W	Dayton	1157965
Feasters Rocks (Marion County, Oregon)	Bar	32 ft (9.8 m)	45°10′07″N 123°00′09″W	Dayton	1157981
Snaggy Bend Bar (Marion County, Oregon)	Bar	29 ft (8.8 m)	45°07′39″N 123°00′21″W	Dayton	1158035
Mission Bar (Yamhill County, Oregon)	Bar	23 ft (7.0 m)	45°13′22″N 123°00′13″W	Dayton	1158378
Eureka Bar (Wallowa County, Oregon)	Bar	284 ft (87 m)	45°49′31″N 116°46′54″W	Deadhorse Ridge	1141912
Brandy Bar (Douglas County, Oregon)	Bar	2 ft (0.61 m)	43°40′44″N 123°55′46″W	Deer Head Point	1138571
Hunter Bar (Columbia County, Oregon)	Bar	1 ft (0.30 m)	45°59′57″N 122°51′45″W	Deer Island	1122144
Flat Rock (Lincoln County, Oregon)	Bar	0 ft (0 m)	44°48′27″N 124°04′09″W	Depoe Bay	1134555
North Reef (Lincoln County, Oregon)	Bar	0 ft (0 m)	44°48′41″N 124°04′12″W	Depoe Bay	1134556
Bunch Bar (Douglas County, Oregon)	Bar	32 ft (9.8 m)	43°38′19″N 123°40′24″W	Devils Graveyard	1132953
Fairview Bar (Wallowa County, Oregon)	Bar	631 ft (192 m)	45°58′52″N 117°36′25″W	Eden Ridge	1120568
North Spit (Coos County, Oregon)	Bar	7 ft (2.1 m)	43°23′11″N 124°18′37″W	Empire	1147065
Skinners Bar (Lane County, Oregon)	Bar	120 ft (37 m)	44°04′14″N 123°06′51″W	Eugene East	1129643
Two Sisters Bar (Lane County, Oregon)	Bar	117 ft (36 m)	44°06′09″N 123°06′19″W	Eugene East	1129650
North Fork Shoal (Lane County, Oregon)	Bar	0 ft (0 m)	43°58′29″N 124°04′54″W	Florence	1156794
Taylor Creek Bar (Josephine County, Oregon)	Bar	227 ft (69 m)	42°33′10″N 123°33′59″W	Galice	1155711
Almeda Bar (Josephine County, Oregon)	Bar	254 ft (77 m)	42°36′19″N 123°34′59″W	Galice	1155715
Sibley Sands (Tillamook County, Oregon)	Bar	0 ft (0 m)	45°31′08″N 123°54′22″W	Garibaldi	1126944
Kilchis Flat (Tillamook County, Oregon)	Bar	0 ft (0 m)	45°30′15″N 123°53′01″W	Garibaldi	1161406
Tompkins Bar (Lincoln County, Oregon)	Bar	28 ft (8.5 m)	45°07′10″N 122°59′52″W	Gervais	1128153
Doyle Rock (Curry County, Oregon)	Bar	4 ft (1.2 m)	42°25′36″N 124°25′27″W	Gold Beach	1134135
Elephant Rock (Curry County, Oregon)	Bar	10 ft (3.0 m)	42°26′51″N 124°22′46″W	Gold Beach	1134136
Rogue River Reef (Curry County, Oregon)	Bar	0 ft (0 m)	42°27′10″N 124°28′56″W	Gold Beach	1148700
Ferry Hole Bar (Curry County, Oregon)	Bar	6 ft (1.8 m)	42°27′34″N 124°22′44″W	Gold Beach	1154883
Pittsburg Bar (Wallowa County, Oregon)	Bar	350 ft (110 m)	45°37′39″N 116°28′20″W	Grave Point	1125454
Collier Bar (Josephine County, Oregon)	Bar	91 ft (28 m)	42°24′59″N 124°00′39″W	Horse Sign Butte	1139996
Foster Bar (Curry County, Oregon)	Bar	51 ft (16 m)	42°38′03″N 124°02′52″W	Illahe	1155745
Horseshoe Bar (Lane County, Oregon)	Bar	96 ft (29 m)	44°13′54″N 123°09′24″W	Junction City	1129654
Bells Shute Bar (Lane County, Oregon)	Bar	105 ft (32 m)	44°10′29″N 123°08′34″W	Junction City	1129657
Maupin Bar (Douglas County, Oregon)	Bar	48 ft (15 m)	43°34′54″N 123°32′04″W	Kellogg	1160474
Jones Bar (Douglas County, Oregon)	Bar	43 ft (13 m)	43°35′15″N 123°31′34″W	Kellogg	1160475
Battle Bar (Curry County, Oregon)	Bar	143 ft (44 m)	42°42′27″N 123°47′22″W	Kelsey Peak	1137580
China Bar (Curry County, Oregon)	Bar	116 ft (35 m)	42°42′59″N 123°52′29″W	Kelsey Peak	1139657
Missouri Bar (Curry County, Oregon)	Bar	115 ft (35 m)	42°42′36″N 123°49′55″W	Kelsey Peak	1146363
Winkle Bar (Curry County, Oregon)	Bar	145 ft (44 m)	42°42′04″N 123°48′20″W	Kelsey Peak	1152534
Oregon Bar (Josephine County, Oregon)	Bar	642 ft (196 m)	42°07′49″N 123°27′49″W	Kerby Peak	1155090
Yankee Bar (Wallowa County, Oregon)	Bar	367 ft (112 m)	45°34′27″N 116°29′34″W	Kirkwood Creek	1153100
Jim Crow Sands (Clatsop County, Oregon)	Bar	0 ft (0 m)	46°14′57″N 123°34′45″W	Knappa	1122428
Oswego Rock (Clackamas County, Oregon)	Bar	14 ft (4.3 m)	45°24′41″N 122°39′21″W	Lake Oswego	1125058
Thesing Bar (Clackamas County, Oregon)	Bar	3 ft (0.91 m)	45°25′31″N 122°39′10″W	Lake Oswego	1128003
Caribou Bar (Baker County, Oregon)	Bar	708 ft (216 m)	44°27′16″N 117°19′48″W	Lime	1118607
Salishan Spit (Lincoln County, Oregon)	Bar	1 ft (0.30 m)	44°54′34″N 124°01′49″W	Lincoln City	1134839
Siletz Reef (Lincoln County, Oregon)	Bar	0 ft (0 m)	44°57′30″N 124°02′30″W	Lincoln City	2130515
Tacklebuster Reef (Lincoln County, Oregon)	Bar	0 ft (0 m)	44°57′26″N 124°02′15″W	Lincoln City	2440010
Mack Reef (Curry County, Oregon)	Bar	0 ft (0 m)	42°14′22″N 124°24′56″W	Mack Point	1145712
Gleason Bar (Curry County, Oregon)	Bar	86 ft (26 m)	42°42′12″N 123°55′25″W	Marial	1116487
Blossom Bar (Curry County, Oregon)	Bar	85 ft (26 m)	42°42′08″N 123°55′17″W	Marial	1138274
Brushy Bar (Curry County, Oregon)	Bar	71 ft (22 m)	42°40′45″N 123°56′49″W	Marial	1138705
Half Moon Bar (Curry County, Oregon)	Bar	101 ft (31 m)	42°41′36″N 123°56′31″W	Marial	1143205
Paradise Bar (Curry County, Oregon)	Bar	107 ft (33 m)	42°41′52″N 123°56′04″W	Marial	1147412
Solitude Bar (Curry County, Oregon)	Bar	77 ft (23 m)	42°40′16″N 123°57′20″W	Marial	1149870
Darrow Bar (Polk County, Oregon)	Bar	32 ft (9.8 m)	45°00′15″N 123°04′16″W	Mission Bottom	1119691
Eldriedge Bar (Marion County, Oregon)	Bar	29 ft (8.8 m)	45°06′40″N 123°00′13″W	Mission Bottom	1120431
Lincoln Bar (Marion County, Oregon)	Bar	33 ft (10 m)	45°02′02″N 123°04′04″W	Mission Bottom	1123092
Lincoln Rocks (Polk County, Oregon)	Bar	32 ft (9.8 m)	45°01′00″N 123°04′32″W	Mission Bottom	1123098
Spongs Bar (Marion County, Oregon)	Bar	36 ft (11 m)	45°01′34″N 123°04′21″W	Mission Bottom	1127398
Windsor Bar (Polk County, Oregon)	Bar	29 ft (8.8 m)	45°03′17″N 123°04′07″W	Mission Bottom	1129219
Matheny Bar (Yamhill County, Oregon)	Bar	31 ft (9.4 m)	45°06′14″N 123°00′54″W	Mission Bottom	1157416
Union Bar (Marion County, Oregon)	Bar	29 ft (8.8 m)	45°04′39″N 123°04′01″W	Mission Bottom	1157417
Lone Tree Bar (Marion County, Oregon)	Bar	38 ft (12 m)	45°04′07″N 123°03′44″W	Mission Bottom	1158005
Lower Martine Bar (Yamhill County, Oregon)	Bar	28 ft (8.5 m)	45°06′04″N 123°01′28″W	Mission Bottom	1158006
Lower Simon Bar (Marion County, Oregon)	Bar	29 ft (8.8 m)	45°03′29″N 123°03′21″W	Mission Bottom	1158007
McCall Bar (Marion County, Oregon)	Bar	34 ft (10 m)	45°02′08″N 123°03′51″W	Mission Bottom	1158009
McCloskie Bar (Marion County, Oregon)	Bar	33 ft (10 m)	45°02′52″N 123°03′37″W	Mission Bottom	1158010
Upper Martine Bar (Yamhill County, Oregon)	Bar	26 ft (7.9 m)	45°06′18″N 123°01′42″W	Mission Bottom	1158045
Upper Simon Bar (Marion County, Oregon)	Bar	32 ft (9.8 m)	45°03′16″N 123°03′21″W	Mission Bottom	1158046
Wheatland Bar (Yamhill County, Oregon)	Bar	28 ft (8.5 m)	45°05′50″N 123°02′15″W	Mission Bottom	1158055
Matheny Bar (Yamhill County, Oregon)	Bar	29 ft (8.8 m)	45°06′16″N 123°00′47″W	Mission Bottom	1638248
Murphy Bar (Polk County, Oregon)	Bar	47 ft (14 m)	44°49′40″N 123°09′24″W	Monmouth	1124547
Ostenbery Bar (Curry County, Oregon)	Bar	9 ft (2.7 m)	42°04′04″N 124°13′14″W	Mount Emily	1154700
Multnomah Falls Bar (Multnomah County, Oregon)	Bar	6 ft (1.8 m)	45°34′59″N 122°07′24″W	Multnomah Falls	1156802
Nehalem Bank (Clatsop County, Oregon)	Bar	490 ft (150 m)	45°54′00″N 124°33′00″W	Tillamook	Outside the 12-mile limit for GNIS coordinates
Nehalem Spit (Tillamook County)	Bar	7 ft (2.1 m)	45°41′09″N 123°56′14″W	Nehalem	1132417
North Spit (Tillamook County, Oregon)	Bar	6 ft (1.8 m)	45°11′03″N 123°57′56″W	Nestucca Bay	1163182
Netarts Spit (Tillamook County, Oregon)	Bar	11 ft (3.4 m)	45°24′29″N 123°57′34″W	Netarts	1154419
Yaquina Reef (Lincoln County, Oregon)	Bar	0 ft (0 m)	44°37′10″N 124°05′16″W	Newport South	1135958
South Reef (Lincoln County, Oregon)	Bar	0 ft (0 m)	44°36′10″N 124°05′18″W	Newport South	1135959
Sawyer Bar (Lane County, Oregon)	Bar	1,991 ft (607 m)	44°11′17″N 121°48′07″W	North Sister	1126626
Eureka Bar (Columbia County, Oregon)	Bar	7 ft (2.1 m)	46°09′49″N 123°13′44″W	Oak Point	1162765
Pony Bar (Wallowa County, Oregon)	Bar	433 ft (132 m)	45°27′15″N 116°34′34″W	Old Timer Mountain	1152899
Miami Bar (Josephine County, Oregon)	Bar	279 ft (85 m)	42°21′32″N 123°47′14″W	Pearsoll Peak	1155696
Prescott Bar (Columbia County, Oregon)	Bar	2 ft (0.61 m)	46°03′04″N 122°53′09″W	Rainier	1162802
Seaman Bar (Jackson County, Oregon)	Bar	297 ft (91 m)	42°25′10″N 123°11′54″W	Rogue River	1135242
Fishtrap Shoal (Columbia County, Oregon)	Bar	4 ft (1.2 m)	45°47′45″N 122°47′31″W	Saint Helens	1120790
Saint Helens Bar (Columbia County, Oregon)	Bar	9 ft (2.7 m)	45°52′03″N 122°47′31″W	Saint Helens	1126469
Henrici Bar (historical) (Columbia County, Oregon)	Bar	3 ft (0.91 m)	45°48′09″N 122°47′36″W	Saint Helens	1163997
Ray Bar (Yamhill County, Oregon)	Bar	23 ft (7.0 m)	45°14′08″N 122°59′50″W	Saint Paul	1125851
Darrow Rocks (Polk County, Oregon)	Bar	33 ft (10 m)	44°59′46″N 123°04′07″W	Salem West	1119692
Beardsley Bar (Marion County, Oregon)	Bar	35 ft (11 m)	44°59′25″N 123°03′45″W	Salem West	1162833
Doves Bar (Marion County, Oregon)	Bar	41 ft (12 m)	44°54′30″N 123°07′25″W	Salem West	1162947
Gray Eagle Bar (Marion County, Oregon)	Bar	39 ft (12 m)	44°55′16″N 123°06′25″W	Salem West	1851700
Salmon Rock (Jackson County, Oregon)	Bar	397 ft (121 m)	42°26′24″N 122°57′04″W	Sams Valley	1134769
Post Office Bar (historical) (Multnomah County, Oregon)	Bar	3 ft (0.91 m)	45°38′09″N 122°47′04″W	Sauvie Island	1164008
Whiteman Bar (Polk County, Oregon)	Bar	48 ft (15 m)	44°47′52″N 123°06′18″W	Sidney	1129014
Judson Rocks (Polk County, Oregon)	Bar	46 ft (14 m)	44°49′15″N 123°06′44″W	Sidney	1158302
Kimball Bar (Curry County, Oregon)	Bar	15 ft (4.6 m)	42°28′54″N 124°18′54″W	Signal Buttes	1132618
Canfield Bar (Curry County, Oregon)	Bar	13 ft (4.0 m)	42°28′09″N 124°21′04″W	Signal Buttes	1135029
Coyote Bar (Curry County, Oregon)	Bar	10 ft (3.0 m)	42°28′14″N 124°20′24″W	Signal Buttes	1135031
Orchard Bar (Curry County, Oregon)	Bar	14 ft (4.3 m)	42°29′29″N 124°18′32″W	Signal Buttes	1159262
Dixson Bar (Grant County, Oregon)	Bar	1,135 ft (346 m)	44°53′52″N 118°36′19″W	Silver Butte	1141090
Deadman Bar (Josephine County, Oregon)	Bar	183 ft (56 m)	42°24′43″N 123°55′46″W	Silver Peak	1140730
Rock Bar (Wallowa County, Oregon)	Bar	426 ft (130 m)	45°19′50″N 116°40′04″W	Squirrel Prairie	1152894
Two Bars (Wallowa County, Oregon)	Bar	693 ft (211 m)	45°22′10″N 116°38′39″W	Squirrel Prairie	1152896
High Bar (Wallowa County, Oregon)	Bar	392 ft (119 m)	45°30′25″N 116°33′29″W	Temperance Creek	1152999
Little Bar (Wallowa County, Oregon)	Bar	383 ft (117 m)	45°31′30″N 116°32′14″W	Temperance Creek	1153000
Greeley Bar (Malheur County, Oregon)	Bar	845 ft (258 m)	43°12′30″N 117°32′17″W	The Hole in the Ground	1121366
Clarks Bar (Tillamook County, Oregon)	Bar	7 ft (2.1 m)	45°26′20″N 123°46′14″W	Tillamook	1135289
Caufield Bar (Tillamook County, Oregon)	Bar	11 ft (3.4 m)	45°28′44″N 123°47′04″W	Tillamook	1135290
Chetco Bar (Curry County, Oregon)	Bar	240 ft (73 m)	42°16′54″N 123°57′49″W	Tincup Peak	1139610
Taggarts Bar (Curry County, Oregon)	Bar	298 ft (91 m)	42°16′00″N 123°55′01″W	Tincup Peak	1150835
Powell Bar (Douglas County, Oregon)	Bar	80 ft (24 m)	43°28′29″N 123°33′14″W	Tyee	1132630
Branton Bar (Douglas County, Oregon)	Bar	101 ft (31 m)	43°23′34″N 123°32′34″W	Tyee	1132638
Heceta Bank (Lane County, Oregon)	Bar	0 ft (0 m)	44°04′59″N 124°50′05″W	Unknown	1133193
Stonewall Bank (Lincoln County, Oregon)	Bar	0 ft (0 m)	44°31′29″N 124°23′34″W	Unknown	1637953
Geneva Bar (Wallowa County, Oregon)	Bar	269 ft (82 m)	45°53′39″N 116°50′40″W	Wapshilla Creek	1142608
Desdemona Sands	Bar	0 ft (0 m)	46°12′22″N 123°53′55″W	Warrenton	1119878
Jetty Sands (Clatsop County, Oregon)	Bar	0 ft (0 m)	46°13′25″N 123°59′42″W	Warrenton	1122421
Onion Rock (Multnomah County, Oregon)	Bar	6 ft (1.8 m)	45°32′32″N 122°16′08″W	Washougal	1125000
Fishers Bar (Wallowa County, Oregon)	Bar	546 ft (166 m)	45°14′23″N 116°42′22″W	White Monument	1142181
Ork Reef (Douglas County, Oregon)	Bar	2 ft (0.61 m)	43°41′02″N 124°10′59″W	Winchester Bay	1147273
North Spit (Douglas County, Oregon)	Bar	6 ft (1.8 m)	43°42′29″N 124°11′01″W	Winchester Bay	1156072
Panther Bar (Josephine County, Oregon)	Bar	303 ft (92 m)	42°22′33″N 123°48′37″W	York Butte	1147385
Brushy Bar (Josephine County, Oregon)	Bar	456 ft (139 m)	42°22′34″N 123°46′25″W	York Butte	1158146

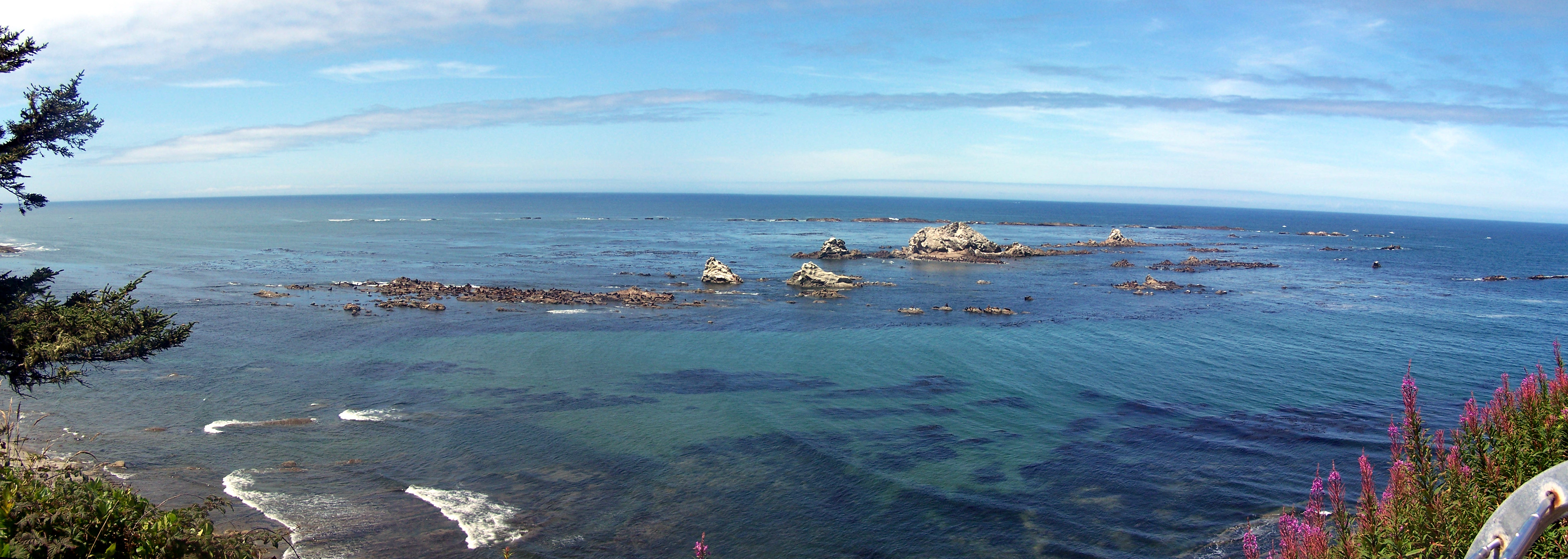
Simpson Reef near Coos Bay

== See also ==
- Lists of Oregon-related topics
