= Siletz Reef =

Reef off the coast of Oregon

Coordinates: 44.9583333°N 124.0416667°W

The Siletz Reef is a large and shallow reef, just offshore the central coast of Oregon. It runs about 1 mile (1.6 km) mile offshore from a southern boundary off Depoe Bay, though some references have it going as far south as Cape Perpetua to a northern boundary off Lincoln City, Oregon, though a northern boundary of Cascade Head is in some references. The reef is rocky and is believed to comprise a few fairly large continuous rock structures and a wide expanse of smaller structures.

It has been written as about 1 mile (1.6 km) offshore from Lincoln City, Oregon.

The reef is often fished, and many whale watching and sightseeing charter vessels operate near the reef.

== Common species in the reef ==
Black rockfish comprise up 23% of the total fish. Blue rockfish, kelp greenling and juvenile rockfish were next at 14%. Lingcod and Canary rockfish and each made up roughly 9%, with yellowtail rockfish at 3%. Species occurring only rarely or less than 3% of the total were China rockfish, copper rockfish, yelloweye rockfish, quillback rockfish, skates, sculpins, flatfish and ratfish.

== Topography ==
Siletz Reef has highly variable bathymetry and variable underwater topography.

Relief in the northern Siletz Reef can be quite dramatic. Massive structures, up to 20 metres (66 ft) vertical to several 10 feet (3.0 m) across are found there. These are covered with the anemone Metridium giganteum which seem abundant in a shallow area locals known as "Tacklebuster Reef." Relatively small patches off Cape Perpetua have both high density and high diversity of fish.

== See also ==
- Gleneden Beach
- Nehalem Bank
- Newport, Oregon
- Ocean bank
- Orford Reef
- Perpetua Reef
- Shoal
- Siletz Bay
- Siletz Bay National Wildlife Refuge
- Siletz River
- Stonewall Bank (Lincoln County, Oregon)
- Three Arch Rocks National Wildlife Refuge
