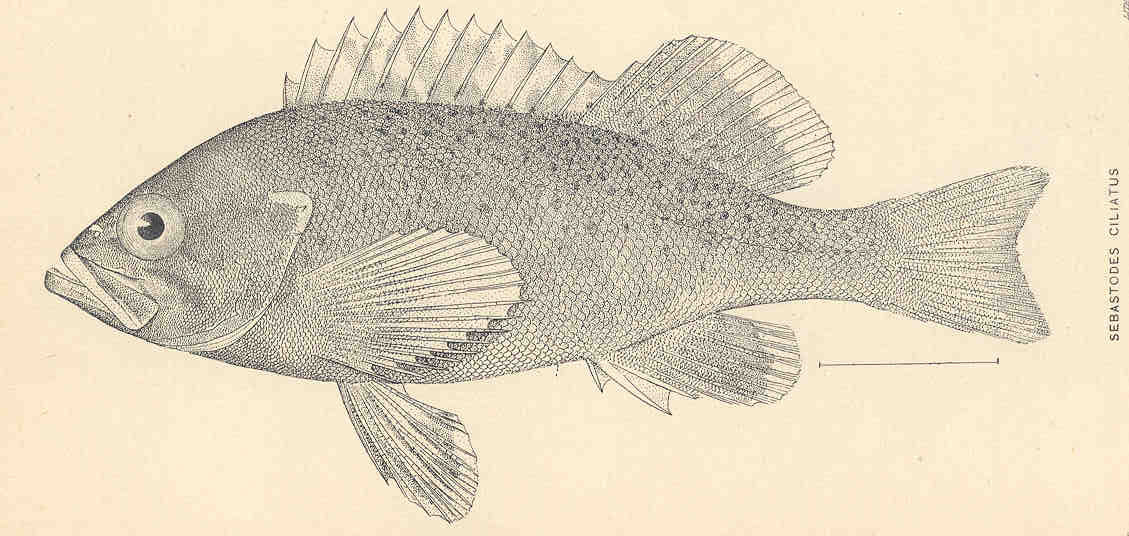

Scientific classification
- Kingdom: Animalia
- Phylum: Chordata
- Class: Actinopterygii
- Order: Perciformes
- Family: Scorpaenidae
- Genus: Sebastes
- Species: S. ciliatus

Binomial name
- Sebastes ciliatus (Tilesius, 1813)

Synonyms
- Epinephelus ciliatus Tilesius, 1813; Sebastichthys ciliatus (Tilesius, 1813); Sebastodes ciliatus (Tilesius, 1813); Sebastostomus ciliatus (Tilesius, 1813)

= Sebastes ciliatus =

Species of fish

Sebastes ciliatus, the dusky rockfish, is a species of marine ray-finned fish belonging to the subfamily Sebastinae, the rockfishes, part of the family Scorpaenidae. It is typically found in the North Pacific Ocean, specifically in the Bering Sea near British Columbia, in the Gulf of Alaska, and in the depths of the Aleutian Islands.

== Taxonomy ==
Sebastes ciliatus was first formally described in 1813 as Epinephelus ciliatus by the German naturalist and explorer Wilhelm Gottlieb Tilesius von Tilenau with the type locality given as the Lynn Canal, north of Funter Bay. The species Sebastes ciliatus (dark dusky) and Sebastes variabilis (light dusky) were previously considered conspecific before being reclassified as separate species based on a genetic study. The latter are found in deeper waters than the former. Some authorities place this species in the subgenus Sebastosomus. The specific name ciliatus means "ciliate", i.e. similar to an eyelid being fringed with lashes, an allusion to the many accessory scales bearing a resemblance to fringing eyelashes located on posterior field of scales, a feature of the larger scales in most species in the genus Sebastes.

== Description ==
The body of S. ciliatus usually range from dark blue to black all across their body. There are significant deposits of pigment around the tail and midlateral areas. S. ciliatus normally has 28 vertebrae. It has a slightly less prominent symphyseal knob than S. variabilis and its anal fins are more rounded. Juvenile S. ciliatus have head spines that are not found on adult S. ciliatus, indicating that these spines are lost during the transition to adulthood.

The von Bertalanffy growth function is used to explain fish growth as a function of age of the fish. This growth model shows that the growth parameters were similar for both sexes, as well as for all habitats. A distinctive trait that differentiates female S. ciliatus from other females of other rockfish species is that the maximum length of female S. ciliatus is closer to that of males.

== Habitat ==
the species occurs in the North Pacific Ocean, distributed in aggregations across northern Japan to British Columbia. Sebastes ciliatus are found in large numbers in the Gulf of Alaska, especially around submarine canyon openings and deep ocean banks. Most adults of S. ciliatus are found at a depth of around 100-200m. Throughout the development of S. ciliatus, each stage of development correlates with a respective habitat. Larger and older rockfish of this species are often located at deeper depths, unlike their smaller and younger counterparts. The light dusky rockfish is more commonly found on the outer continental shelf and upper slope at depths of 675m and is rarely found in nearshore marine habitats. The darker colored form of dusky rockfish is more commonly found in nearshore habitats and is usually not found at depths beyond 160m. In areas where the distributions of both species, S. ciliatus and S. variabilis overlap, S. variabilis is located at greater depths where there are stronger currents, whereas S. ciliatus are found living among kelp, Macrocystis, along with S. melanops.

== Fisheries ==
Sebastes ciliatus is one among many species of rockfish that is targeted as commercial harvest in the North Pacific. Since 1998, the two forms of dusky rockfish are placed into designated fisheries that are managed by the U.S. federal and Alaska state agencies. The increasing development of the S. ciliatus offshore fishery was due to the decline in Pacific ocean perch harvest. The light dusky rockfish is dominant in the marine shelf rockfish fisheries. The dark dusky rockfish are usually placed in nearshore fisheries. In the Aleutian and Gulf of Alaska waters, S. ciliatus is often caught by trawl with S. melanops(black rockfish) as S.ciliatus is frequently mistaken for the black rockfish. The females that are caught by trawl in the summer were often near-term and bear eyed larvae.
