= Heceta Bank =

Rocky bank off the coast of Oregon, United States

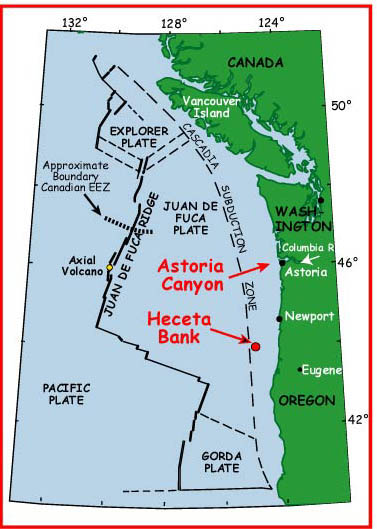
Fig. 1. Map of Heceta Bank

Heceta Bank is a rocky bank located 55 kilometers (km) off the Oregon coast near Florence, centered on approximately 44°N, 125°W, and is roughly 29 km long and upwards of 13 km wide. Heceta Bank is an area of ecological and oceanographic importance. The unique bathymetric features and seasonal circulation within the bank provides habitat for a diversity of economically-important fish species.

Heceta Bank also plays an important role in current understanding of prehistoric human migration. During the last glacial low stand, approximately 15,000–20,000 years ago, prehistoric humans migrated from northeastern Asia into North America. Scientists hypothesize that Heceta Bank, due to its topography and morphology, is a possible area of this historical migration.

== Geomorphology ==
=== Formation ===
Heceta Bank is one of four commonly-identified offshore rocky banks – including Nehalem, Stonewall, and Coquille – that break up the outer limits of the continental shelf off the central Oregon coast. The banks were formed by the subduction of oceanic plates, which created uplift of the continental crust and exposed much of the rocks found on the banks today. Some of these rocks, particularly those discovered on Heceta Bank, date back to the Pleistocene and pre-late Miocene. The presence of these old rocks, as well as a series of folds and faults underneath the banks, provide evidence for this subduction and uplift phenomenon.

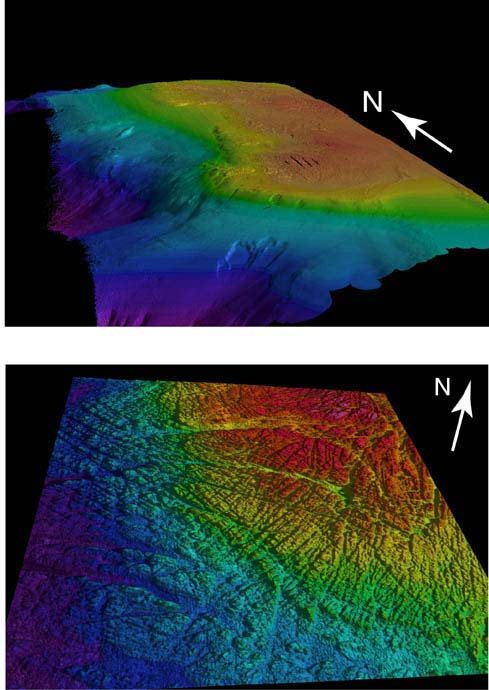
Fig. 2. 3-D Maps of Heceta Bank using multibeam sonar data. Top pane shows bathymetry for the entire bank. Bottom pane is a close-up view of the north crest.

=== Bathymetry and slope ===
The continental shelf off the Oregon coast ranges from approximately 17 to 74 km in width, from the shoreline to the edge of the continental slope, and reaches a maximum depth of 145 to 183 meters (m) on its outer limits. The shelf has a relatively steep, downward facing seafloor as it transitions into the continental slope. However, due to uplift of the continental crust, Heceta Bank extends the outer limits of the continental shelf and creates an area with relatively shallower bathymetry and less-steep seafloor slope. On its landward side, the bank starts at a depth of 60 m and progressively deepens until it reaches its seaward face, where the bathymetry drops abruptly to 1000 m in depth. The bank consists of a north and south crest, which are shoals where the bathymetry is distinctly shallower than the surrounding seafloor (Fig. 2). These two crests are separated by an expansive area where the seafloor deepens and reaches a depth of approximately 104 m – also called a saddle.

=== Sedimentary characteristics ===
To the east, Heceta Bank is bound by a steep and smooth continental shelf. In contrast, the bank's topography is relatively complex and irregular. In shallow depths (<100 m), the bank is composed primarily of rock and boulder outcrops, which are separated by small valley-like features. These valleys are presumed to have been created from the erosion of waves during historical periods when sea level was much lower than it is currently. At greater depths, the seafloor transitions to smaller cobbles and fine-grain sediment, such as mud and silt. This complex seafloor provides important habitat for many benthic-dwelling species, such as rockfish and other demersal species. Furthermore, the irregularity in topography, caused by movement due to crustal uplift and transform faults, also allows for the release of methane gas from the sediment, which occurs from <100 to 600 m depth.

== Physical oceanography ==
=== General Oregon coast ocean dynamics ===
Heceta Bank's ocean currents and dynamics are similar to that of the entire Oregon coast. Along the Oregon coast, the California Current is the major Pacific Ocean Current. It runs southward, bringing colder subarctic water down along the West Coast. The Davidson Current is a coastal counter-current that runs northward along the inside of the California Current. Wind forcing and topography play a large role in the circulation and flow of the coastal waters.

The Oregon coast experiences seasonal wind forcing and subsequently operates under two distinct systems: upwelling and downwelling. In the summer months, typically April to September, wind flow is generally southward. These southward flowing winds cause surface currents to move away from the coastline, in a process known as Ekman transport. Thus, upwelling occurs to replace the coastal surface water, bringing cold, nutrient rich water up from the seafloor. During the winter months when winds primarily flow to the north, downwelling becomes the dominant system. Downwelling acts in the opposite manner of upwelling, transporting coastal surface water to depth. The spring transition from the winter downwelling-dominant system to the summer upwelling-dominant system is quick and includes a sudden drop in sea level of around 10 cm in just a few days. Conversely, the fall transition from upwelling back to downwelling, and the resultant rise in sea level, is significantly more gradual. Although upwelling and downwelling are generally seasonably favored, they can occur during either season since they driven by wind direction.

As explored below, the topographic variations unique to Heceta Bank significantly influence how these wind-driven seasonal changes affect this region. This influence is largely because areas with a wider continental shelf respond less strongly to the wind-driven forces.

=== Summer circulation ===
Seasonal upwelling transports colder, more dense bottom waters up to the surface along the coastline due to the dominant southward wind stress on the coastal waters. The upwelled water brings nutrients up to the surface euphotic zone. Summer surface temperatures of the water range from approximately 7 °C on the coastline up to 14 °C along the outer edge of Heceta Bank. At the same time, high-density bottom water is advected over the bank by northward bottom currents. Relatively less dense water on the outer southern part of Heceta Bank is also present in the bottom density field. Downwelling, although more typical during the winter, has also been observed during the summer months with events lasting 2–10 days. During the summer of 2001, for example, downwelling favorable conditions were present 29% of the time.

==== Geostrophic jet ====
The upwelling front is accompanied by a geostrophic upwelling jet. During the summer upwelling season, the southward flowing jet off of central Oregon lies mid-shelf at approximately the 100-m isobath. Its near-surface speed averages 0.35 m/s, with individual events exceeding 0.80 m/s. This is faster than the surrounding water velocity. The bathymetry of Heceta Bank causes the upwelling jet to move further offshore as it follows the bottom contours around the bank until it reaches the southern edge at the 200-m isobath. Here, approximately 0.5 Sverdrup of the cold upwelled water is exported out into the deep ocean as the jet cannot follow the continental shelf's abrupt turn back towards the coastline. The amount of materials lost into the deep ocean depends on the velocity of the jet, which is largely determined by the strength of the wind-driven currents.

The movement of the upwelling jet around the seaward face of Heceta Bank causes the inshore side of the bank to have a significantly weaker flow. This sheltered region allows water parcels to remain on the inshore side for a relatively longer period of time. The longer retention time means marine organisms can remain over the bank longer, increasing the risk of hypoxia and aquatic invasive species establishment. In the southern sheltered region of the bank, a northward flow is often observed because of the cyclonic movement of the flow as it adjusts to the deepening water column.

=== Winter circulation ===
Seasonal downwelling transports warmer, less dense surface waters down to the seafloor as the northward wind stress causes the surface Ekman transport to shift onshore. The downwelling also transports organic matter down to the seafloor from the productive euphotic zone in the surface layer.

The shelf bathymetry and topography play a large role in the dynamics during these winter months as well. During downwelling conditions, there is a northward downwelling jet centered on the 130-m isobath along continental shelf, but as it moves over the bank, it shoals to the 80-m isobath. In contrast to the southward upwelling jet, the northward downwelling jet has a reduced velocity. Therefore, its path around the bank is not as strong and noticeable, resulting in less offshore deflection and no reversed currents, as seen during upwelling conditions. Inshore of the jet is an area of well-mixed water. Overall, the bank is an area of decreased downwelling strength.

=== Future research ===
There is much room for future research as current understanding of oceanographic dynamics associated with Heceta Bank is growing, but limited. The majority of observed data comes from only two programs. Coastal Ocean Advances in Shelf Transport (COAST) was a 5-year project funded by the National Science Foundation (NSF) as part of the national Coastal Ocean Processes (CoOP) project. The majority of the data was collected in summer of 2001 and winter of 2003. The project involved participants from Oregon State University (OSU), the University of North Carolina at Chapel Hill (UNC) and the Lamont–Doherty Earth Observatory (LDEO). The Partnership for Interdisciplinary Studies of Coastal Oceans (PISCO) program has also collected data through moorings and played a large role in expanding knowledge of the Oregon upwelling system of the inner shelf.

One area of research still relatively unexplored is the impacts of biological and physical processes in the formation of hypoxic water in this area. Most of the research of hypoxic events were conducted after 2002, but much remains unknown. Residence times and pathways for dissolved and particulate matter, especially in the wintertime, is another area of research interest.

== Chemistry ==
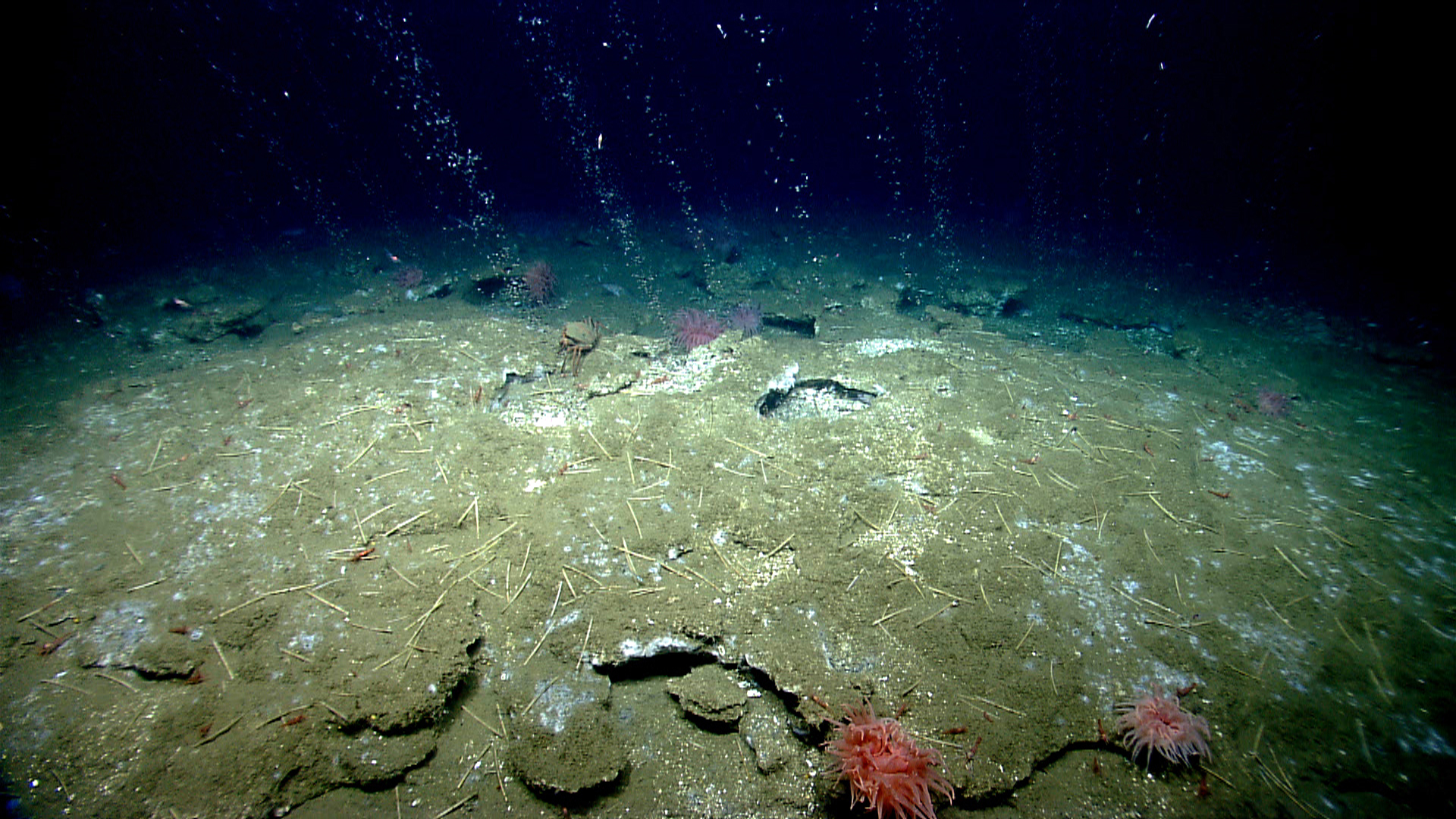
Fig. 3. Methane seeps

=== Methane seeps ===
Methane seeps are located along the downward slope of Heceta Bank, generally clustered in areas known as pockmarks. The pockmarks are formed by the movement of faults, which cause disturbances and conditions within the bedrock to change. Due to uplift, gas solubility in the sediment decreases and gas is ultimately released from the seafloor. The methane gas originates from a mix of thermogenic and biogenic sources, and methane hydrates embedded in the sediment. Thermogenic sources are formed deep within sediment at high temperatures and pressures by thermocatalytic degradation of organic matter. Biogenic sources account for the degradation of organic matter by methanogenic organisms.

==== Pockmarks ====
Pockmarks are generally 100–200 m in diameter and usually located at a depth of 150–400 m. Bubble formation and microbial mats are observed throughout the pockmarks in Heceta Bank. These microbial mats in the sediment along the bank are characterized as white and filamentous. Microbial mats are generally inhabited by chemosynthetic organisms, Beggiatoa and Thiothrix filamentous bacteria, and Methanogen, a group of anaerobic archaea. Other organisms such as clams (e.g., Solemya sp.) and marine bivalve mollusks (e.g., Conchocele bisecta) have been found to inhabit the area around the seeps. Some pockmarks also contain evidence of carbonate formation. The carbonate formations are built by the anaerobic oxidation of methane (AOM) performed by bacteria surrounding the seeps. The origin of these aragonite crystals is supported by the isotopic composition of ^{13}C measured at various locations around the Heceta Bank which show a negative delta value. These negative values indicate the ^{13}C in the samples collected are depleted which correlate to microbial utilization of methane for chemosynthesis. The isotopic composition of ^{13}C varies highly with location, but generally is about −30 ‰ PDB +/- -10 ‰. Overall, methane concentrations above pockmarks around the bank range from 6.4 nmol/L to 54.2 nmol/L with the larger concentrations generally located near the seafloor. Concentrations of methane at the surface ranged from 3 nmol/L to 7 nmol/L.

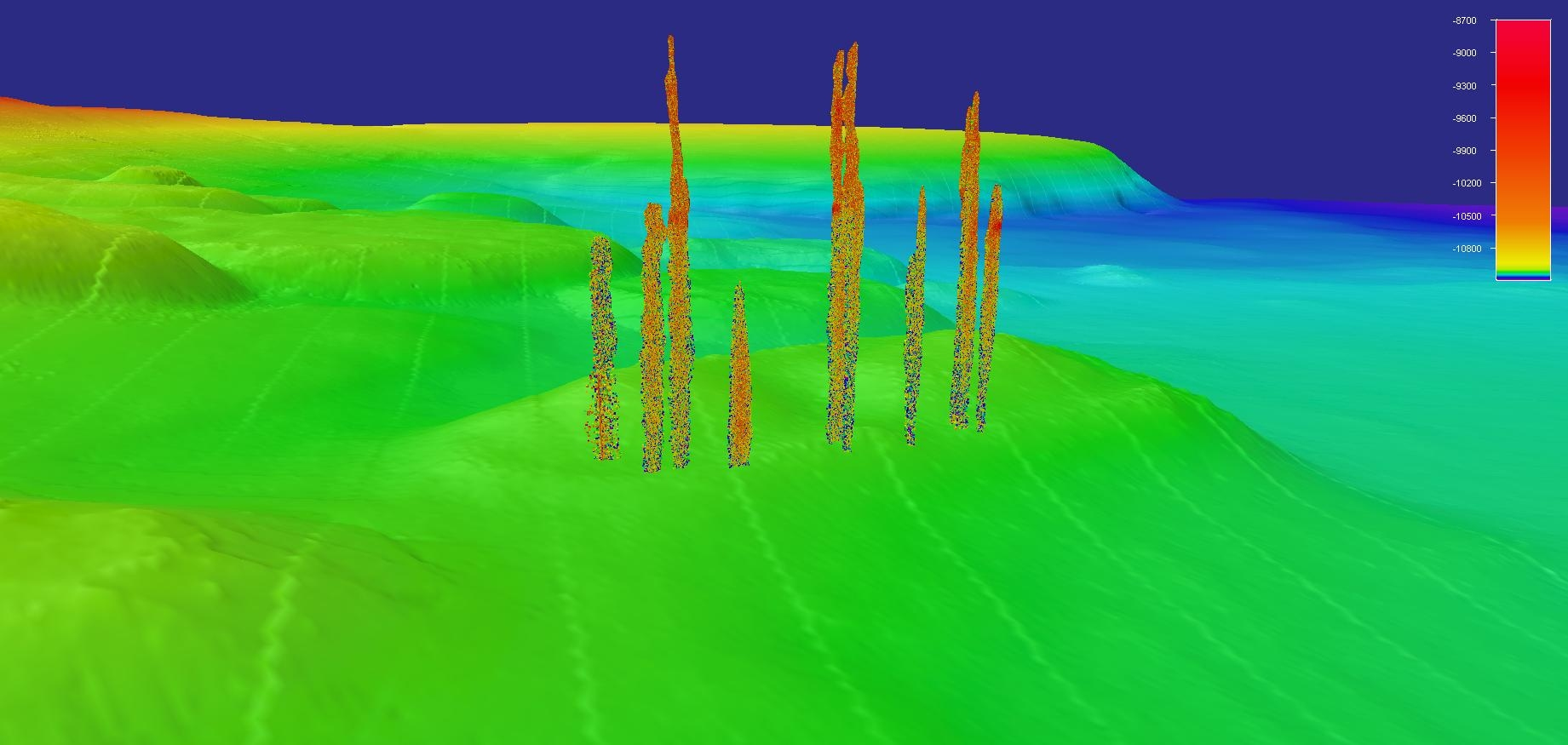
Fig. 4. Multi-beam sonar image of methane seeps.

==== Methane transport ====
The transport of methane emitted from the seeps on Heceta Bank is driven by the flow of the California Undercurrent. The current distributes the gas in the hydrate stability zone, where methane hydrates can form stably in the sediment. The clearing time of methane emitted into the water column on the bank is estimated to be around 22 hours based on average current speeds at a depth of 100–480 m. Microbial methane oxidation only accounts for roughly 14% of the overall methane transport in the area. On the shelf, methane transport is driven by upwelling where enrichment is observed. No significant amount of methane is released to the atmosphere from Heceta Bank alone, but the emission of methane from the seafloor to the atmosphere, worldwide, accounts for 4–9 % of the global methane budget.

==== Earthquake prediction ====
Pockmarks off the coast of California and Greece have been studied to measure the difference in gas emission from methane seeps before, during, and after earthquakes. Evidence gathered in 1980 and 1993 show a significant increase in gas emissions from seeps hours before and after an earthquake occurred. Water temperatures surrounding the pockmarks increased by up to 5 °C during the intervals of increased gas emissions. These observations indicate the pockmarks become hyperactive before and during earthquakes, making gas emission an ideal parameter to help predict earthquakes before they occur.

=== Hypoxia ===
The occurrence of hypoxia in open coast upwelling systems reflects ocean conditions that control the delivery of O_{2}-deficient and nutrient-rich deep water onto continental shelves. The mid-shelf location in the sheltered region of the Heceta Bank complex is especially vulnerable to O_{2}-deficient events due to the large shelf width, as well as weak currents and high productivity. During a 2002 July survey, Oregon Department of Fish and Wildlife found only dead fish and invertebrates in the normally productive fish habitat at Heceta Bank. The hypoxic, or O_{2}-deficient, zone that covered more than 700 km^{2} between Newport and Heceta Head was believed to be the cause of the fish and invertebrate mortality. Since 2002, seasonal hypoxia has been observed annually to extend over an area >820 km^{2} along the Oregon coastal shelf region in the summer months. Samples of dissolved oxygen (DO) point to the fact that in the summer months, bottom waters at Heceta Head line (44.0 N, respectively) were consistently hypoxic, or falling between 43–64 micromolar (μM) of O_{2.} In 2006, anoxia was first observed on the Oregon inner shelf. In August 2006, surveys along the central Oregon coast transect lines revealed the complete absence of all fish from rocky reefs. Low O_{2} conditions are attributed to the onshore movement of low O_{2}, high-nutrient bottom water combined with respiration that followed upwelling-fueled, higher-than-average primary production in surface waters. In addition to increased primary production, respiration can further exacerbate O_{2} deficits as bottom boundary water transits shoreward over the shelf.

==== Chlorophyll a (Chl-a) ====
Chlorophyll a (Chl-a) concentrations in the Heceta Bank region are consistently higher than those in the surrounding shelf. These elevated values are the result of the outcropping of nutrient-rich water from the halocline. During spring, a coastal upwelling jet is located inshore of Heceta Bank and moves offshore during summer. Two immediate consequences of the invasion of subarctic water off Oregon are an increase in primary production and an increase in water column and benthic respiration. Satellite imagery of low temperature and high (Chl-a) concentrations in the bank suggest that upwelling and productivity are enhanced in Heceta Bank in comparison to the surrounding shelf. In July 2003, high (Chl-a) values of 43 mg/L were directly sampled from an inshore shelf station on the Heceta Head line.

==== Nitrogen ====
Anaerobic forms of respiration, such as denitrification, consume nitrate rather than O_{2}. Denitrification appears to be particularly important in shelf sediments in the California current system, due to the seasonally hypoxic bottom waters that typically emerge during summer upwelling. Further, denitrification in the Heceta Bank region by bacteria frees up O_{2} to be utilized by other organisms like rockfish and other demersal fish species.

== Biological oceanography ==
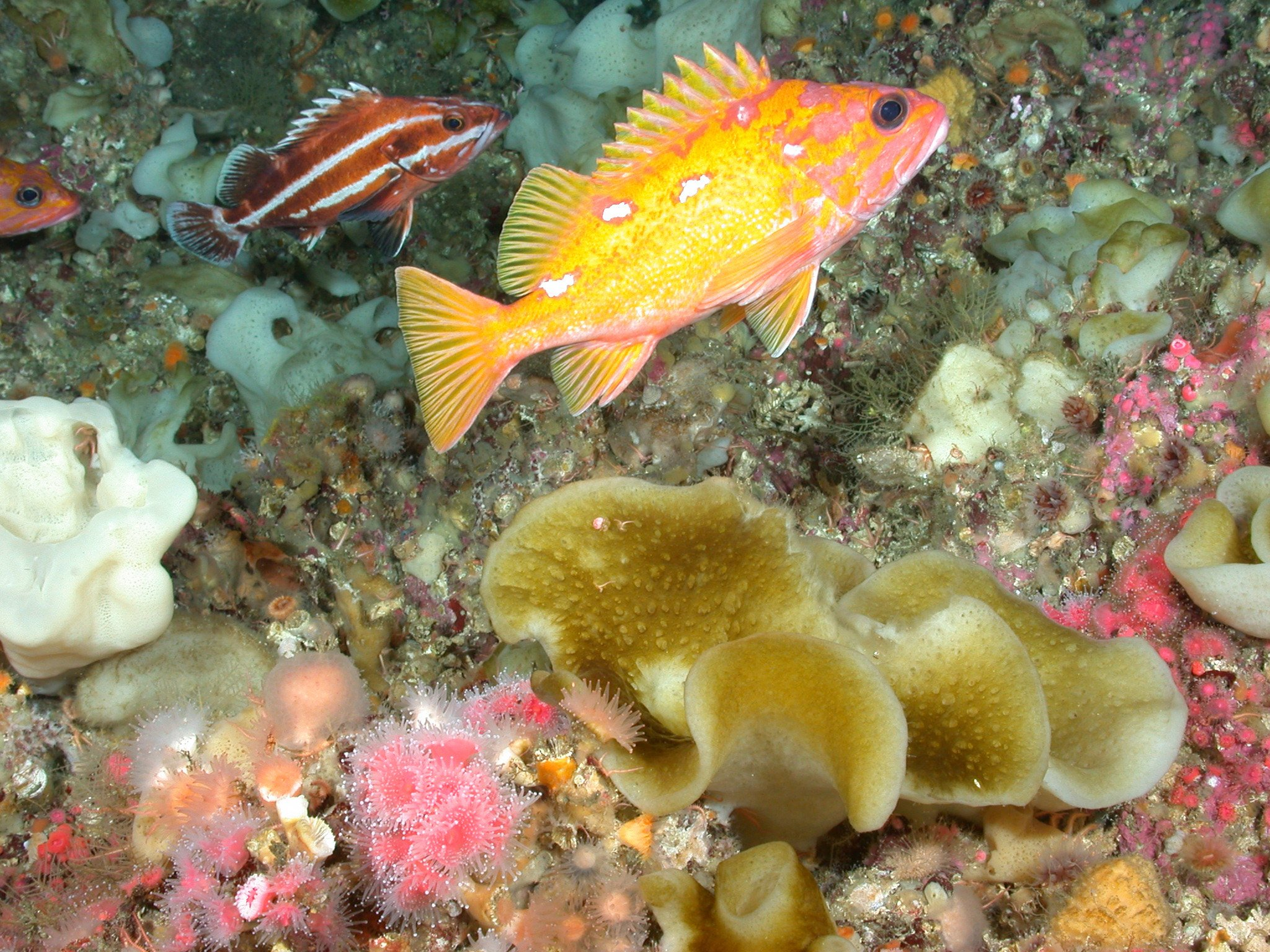
Fig. 5. Yelloweye rockfish.

=== Fish diversity ===
A total of 105 trawl sets were made on nine cruises between 1968 and 1970 in order to study the fish species living in this area. These samples were collected from seven stations at depths ranging from 74 to 195 m. The most abundant species are presented in Table 1.

Table 1. Common and scientific name of most abundant fish species detected in Heceta Bank, ordered from left to the right
Pacific sanddab Citharichthys sordidus	Sebastes juveniles	North Pacific hake Merluccius productus
Rex sole Glyptocephalus zachirus	Petrale sole Eopsetta jordani	Greenstriped Rockfish Sebastes elongatus
Dover sole Microstomus pacificus	Darkblotched rockfish Sebastes crameri	Slim sculpin Radulinus asprellus
Slender sole Lyopsetta exilis	Bigeye poacher Bathyagonus pentacanthus	Splitnose rockfish Sebastes diploproa
Blackbelly eelpout Lycodopsis pacificus	Whitebarred prickleback Poroclinus rothrocki	Northern anchovy Engraulis mordax
Blacktip poacher Xeneretmus latifrons	Eulachon Thaleichthys pacificus	Pacific hagfish Eptatretus stoutii
Shiner perch Cymatogaster aggregata	Whitebait Smelt Allosmerus elongatus	Pacific tomcod Microgadus proximus
English sole Parophrys vetulus	Northern sculpin Icelinus borealis	Speckled sanddab Citharichthys stigmaeus

The most abundant species in shallower areas is the Pacific sanddab, while in deeper areas the slender sole is the most abundant. Studies have detected 34–35 species in deep areas, 24–25 species in intermediate areas, and 19 in shallow areas. Moreover, the Shannon diversity index (H) varies between 0.7 and 2.5, showing the same pattern as the number of species along different depths (higher in deeper areas). In terms of biomass, benthic fish estimates vary from 0.9 to 2.4 g/m^{2}. The species richness and H values are similar to other temperate, demersal fish communities in different latitudes.

Research about diurnal variability in species assemblages and abundance patterns in fish of Heceta Bank has been carried out. There are some general trends in abundance and activity that are species-, depth-, and habitat-specific. For example, Pygmy rockfish and Puget Sound rockfish are species with a considerable day-night change in abundance.

Some species have a higher affinity to inhabit specific kind of substrate. Sebastes spp., including pigmy rockfish and yellow tail rockfish, tend to be mostly found in rocky ridges, but they are almost absent in mud. On the other side, Shortspine thornyhead, dover sole, and rex sole are mostly found in mud substrate and almost absent in rocky ridge environments.

Simulation studies using Regional Ocean Modeling System (ROMS) showed that Heceta Bank is a high-probability region as both a source and destination for settled fish larvae, which is caused by its complex bathymetry and topography. In this area, the transitions between along- and cross-isobath flow lead larvae to follow the topographic contours back toward the coast around the southern side of Heceta Bank, and eventually to flow southward off the southern side of the bank. Moreover, models have shown that larvae have higher survival rates if they are released into this region, which highlights the importance of Heceta Bank for the successful recruitment of fish populations.

=== Macroinvertebrates diversity ===
A study carried out during the month of September in each year from 1988 to 1990 characterized the macroinvertebrate community in Heceta Bank. This study made 42 dives in six stations ranging from 67 to 360 m depth. Table 2 shows the most important species, in terms of abundance, identified.

Table 2. Common and scientific name of most abundant macroinvertebrate species detected in Heceta Bank, ordered from left to the right
Crinoid Florometra serratissima	Blood stars Henricia spp.
Fragile sea urchin Allocentrotus fragilis	Basket star Gorgonocephalus eucinemis
Brittle star Ophiacanthidae	Sand star Luidia foliolata
Sea cucumbers Parastichopus spp.	Sunflower stars Pycnopodia spp.

Basket stars dominate shallow rocky ridges and large boulder environments, crinoids and rosethorn dominate mid-depth boulder-cobbles, crinoids and brittle stars dominate deep cobbles, and fragile sea urchins dominate deep mud slope.

=== Fisheries ===
The bank's main fisheries are: (a) demersal trawl fishery for some species of flatfish, rockfish, and sablefish; (b) midwater trawl fishery for rockfish and Pacific hake; (c) longline fishery for rockfish, sablefish, and Pacific halibut; (4) vertical longline fishery for rockfish; and (e) salmon fishery mainly during upwelling events. Some of these stocks have undergone declines in biomass during the 1980s and 1990s, which were produced by variations in the productivity of the California Current as well as high harvest levels. In particular, some rockfish species showed a higher decline in the 1990s due to life-history characteristics that make them more vulnerable to overfishing. By 2002, seven species of U.S. west coast rockfish, as well as lingcod and Pacific hake or whiting were declared officially overfished. By 2006, only lingcod and hake recovered.

The groundfish trawl fishery may operate from depths as shallow as 18 to 1280 m deep. This fishery is federally-managed and generally consists of vessels that fish from the Canadian to the Mexican borders. Most of this fishery occurs over soft, low-relief bottom (e.g., sand or mud). Prior to 2011, this fishery operated under cumulative landing limits. After 2011, it became an individual fishing quota (IFQ) fishery, which means that a holder owns a quota for a portion of the annual total allowable catch and must hold a quota for each species or species group.

=== Hotspot ===
Heceta Bank is considered a persistent biological hotspot, in terms of biomass and nekton species diversity, in the northern California Current. The most important environmental parameters provoking this feature are sea-surface temperature, salinity, and density, indicating that the mechanisms of the hotspot are related to the flow through the region and differing patterns of circulation. In addition to this, high abundances of prey (e.g., Euphausiids) favors the higher concentrations of nekton species, especially of higher trophic levels (e.g., whales). The community structure of this hotspot varies over time, which means different species structure the community at different seasons and years, which is also an important cause of the persistence of this hotspot. This last point means that associations between species and their functional redundancy are important factors in the high biomass and nekton diversity in this area. On other side, studies have shown that jellyfish have negative effects on nekton species due to competition and predation on fish larvae.

== See also ==
- Nehalem Bank
- Yaquina Bay
- Heceta Head

== External links and references ==
- Oregon State University Youtube video, about Heceta Bank
