= Stonewall Bank =

Shoal off Newport, Oregon, USA

- The Rock Pile
- Stonewall Bank is located off the coast of Oregon
- Location: Pacific Ocean, near Newport, Oregon
- Coordinates: 44°31′29″N 124°23′34″W
- Type: Bar
- Basin countries: United States
- Max. length: 9 miles (14 km)
- Max. width: 2.5 miles (4.0 km)
- Max. depth: 160 metres (520 ft)

Stonewall Bank, also, the Stonewall Bank Yelloweye Rockfish Conservation Areas (YRCA) is a bar, loosely southwest of Newport, Oregon, United States. Waldport and Yachats are also near. It is 17 miles (27 km) southwest of Yaquina Bay Light, and 14 miles (23 km) offshore. Running north, Stonewall Bank is 9 miles (14 km) long and 2.5 miles (4.0 km) wide. Locally, Stonewall Bank is known as the Rock Pile, has good fishing for salmon, black rockfish and flatfish.

It is split by a rocky channel, which was a seaward extension of the Yaquina River, when sea level was lower than today. Stonewall Bank runs from sea level to 160 metres (520 ft) deep, if more technically, its shallowest water is 7 metres (23 ft) deep.

== Inside Stonewall Bank ==
Inside Stonewall bank, it is illegal to fish for Pacific halibut, or any species from the Groundfish Group, which includes lingcod, rockfish, greenling, Pacific cod, skates and flatfish. It is open, for fishing for salmon, steelhead—using authorized methods, during authorized seasons—tuna, and other offshore pelagic species of fish

Stonewall Bank has a buoy, which provides air pressure at sea level, air temperature, sea water temperature, waves, and winds.

== Geology ==
Of geology, Stonewall Bank is the site of a growing, west-verging anticline which strikes north-northwest on the continental shelf, at 44.5° N, southwest of Newport, going eastward, to its onshore continuation, the Yaquina River.

On Stonewall Bank, a fault discovered in 2009 near southwest of Newport could produce an earthquake which compares in size to 1994's magnitude 6.7 quake that hit Northridge, California. The fault is a blind thrust fault.

== See also ==
- Nehalem Bank
- Ocean bank
- Shoal
- Siletz Reef

== External links and references ==
=== General sites ===
- US government site, on Stonewall Bank
- A map
- Another map
- Fishing weather, in Stonewall Bank
- Information on the wave buoy at Stonewall Bank
- Information on Oregon areas, closed to fishing of West Coast Groundfish
- More information on the area, closed to recreational fishing of groundfish and halibut
- A Youtube video
- A Vimeo video

=== Geology ===
- A US government site, on the local fault
- More US government information on the fault
