= Nehalem Bank =

Shoal, loosely southwest of Newport, Oregon, US

- The Shale Pile
- Nehalem Bank
- Location: Pacific Ocean, near Tillamook Head
- Coordinates: 45°54′00″N 124°33′00″W
- Type: Bar
- Ocean/sea sources: Pacific
- Basin countries: United States
- Surface area: 74.6 square kilometres (28.8 mi^{2})
- Max. depth: 160 metres (520 ft)
- Islands: No islands

Nehalem Bank is a bar, off the coast of Oregon, United States. It also has both rocky reefs and mud habitat, and is just northwest of Garibaldi Reef.

Nehalem Bank runs between 150 metres (490 ft) and 200 metres (660 ft) deep, having an area of 74.6 square kilometres (28.8 mi^{2}). It is located off Tillamook Head, hence is off Clatsop County, and is barely south of the mouth of the Columbia River and Astoria Canyon. Nehalem Bank is north of Nehalem Bay.

Nehalem Bank is one of the three major offshore banks of Oregon, the other two being Heceta Bank and Coquille Bank. Nehalem Bank compares in size to Heceta Bank.

== Fishing ==
Nehalem Bank has been trawled, for shrimp.

As of 2020, it is illegal to fish the Nehalem Bank with bottom trawl gear.

== Oceanography and Geology ==
Nehalem Bank has underwater sea stacks and paleoshorelines. There are rocky remnants of former seacliffs which are bored with intertidal pholad clam holes, testifying to what the level of the sea once was.

Methane seeps are found, on Nehalem Bank, also, on Heceta Bank and Coquille Bank. These sites have microbial communities, also known as bacterial mats, in patches close to the sources of methane bubbles. They use methane for their metabolism. Whether the methane could be used the generate power is problematic, introduces many questions.

A north-and northwest-striking geologic fault, the Nehalem Bank Fault, crosses the Nehalem Bank, is estimated to slip 0.5 to 5 millimeters per year. In the forearc of the Cascadia Subduction Zone, this fault underlies the continental shelf.

== See also ==
- Nehalem Bay State Park
- Ocean bank
- Siletz Reef
- Shoal
- Stonewall Bank
- Tillamook Head

== General references ==
- A map
- A map, with Nehalem Bank's geographic coordinates
- A site, about fishing on Nehalem Bank
- An Oregon State site, about pink shrimp on Nehalem Bank
- A study, relating to fishing on Nehalem Bank
- A Youtube, of a dive on Nehalem Bank

=== Geologic references ===
- USGS site on the Nehalem Bank Fault
- Portland State university site on the fault
