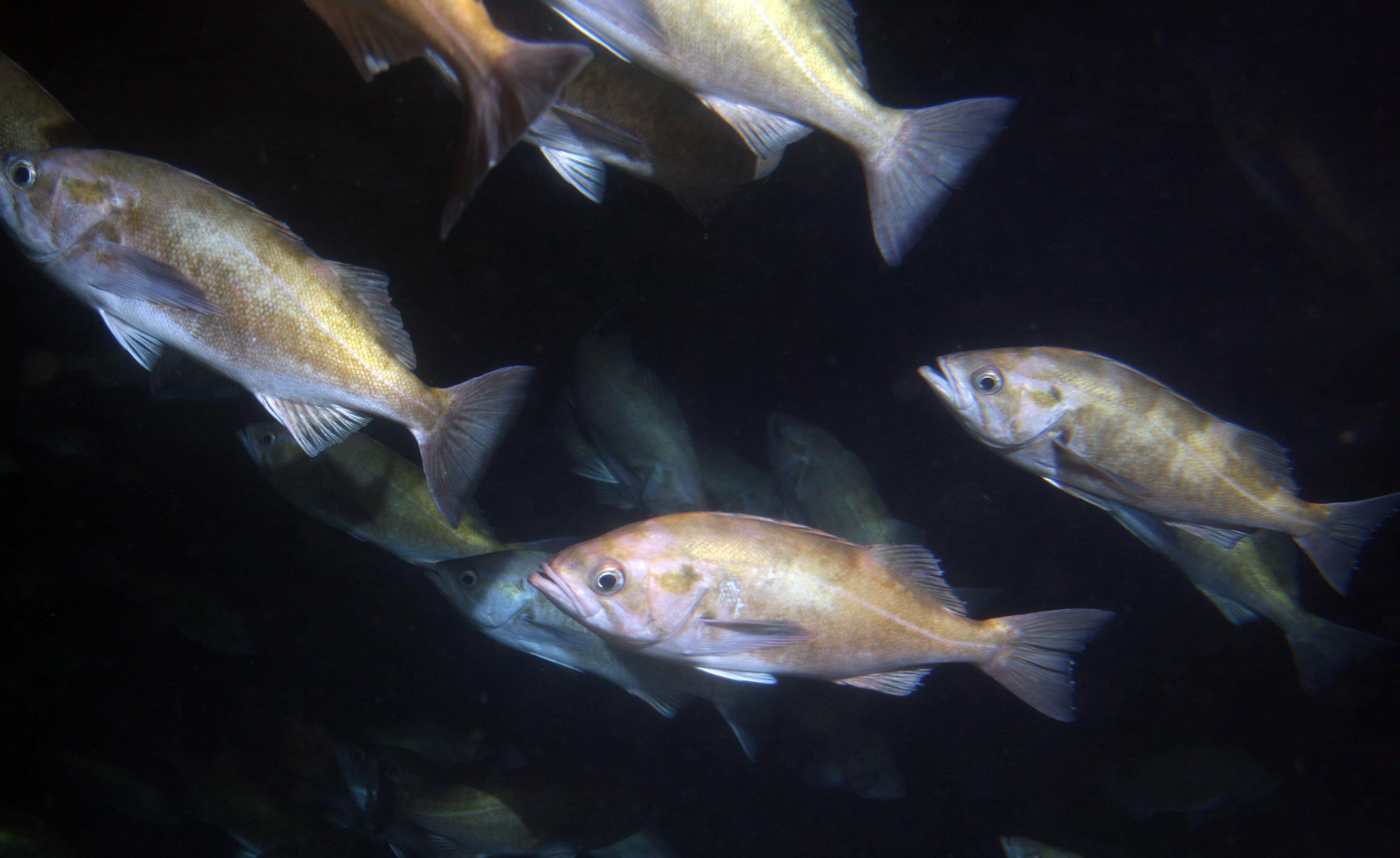
- A school of widow rockfish, Sebastes entomelas

Scientific classification
- Kingdom: Animalia
- Phylum: Chordata
- Class: Actinopterygii
- Order: Perciformes
- Family: Scorpaenidae
- Genus: Sebastes
- Species: S. entomelas

Binomial name
- Sebastes entomelas (D. S. Jordan & C. H. Gilbert, 1880)

Synonyms
- Sebastichthys entomelas Jordan & Gilbert, 1880; Sebastodes entomelas (Jordan & Gilbert, 1880)

= Widow rockfish =

Species of fish

The widow rockfish (Sebastes entomelas), or brown bomber, is a species of marine ray-finned fish belonging to the subfamily Sebastinae, the rockfishes, part of the family Scorpaenidae. It is found in the northeastern Pacific Ocean.

== Taxonomy ==
The widow rockfish was first formally described as Sebastichthys entomelas in 1880 by the American ichthyologists David Starr Jordan and Charles Henry Gilbert with the type locality given as deepwater outside of Monterey Bay, California. Some authorities place this species in the subgenus Acutomentum. The specific name entomelas is a compound of entos meaning "within" and melas which means "black" an allusion to the "jet-black" peritoneum of this species.

== Description ==
The widow rockfish has an elongate and compressed, scale covered body which has a depth which is around one third of its standard length. The head is relatively short, and the upper profile is slightly curved. The mouth is relatively small, the lower jaw projects slightly. The color is brassy brown over most of the body with the belly generally lighter in color, often with a reddish cast. The fin membranes, especially those in the anal and pectoral fins, are black. Specimens smaller than 10 inches (250 mm) are lighter in color and are tinged with vague streaks of orange. There are weak spines on the head and there are 13 spined and 14-16 soft rays in the dorsal fin while the anal fin has 3 spines and 8-10 soft rays. This species attains a maximum total length of 60 cm (24 in).

== Distribution and habitat ==
The widow rockfish occurs from Todos Santos Bay, Baja California, to Albatross Bank, in the Gulf of Alaska. Adult widow rockfishes are most abundant from British Columbia to northern California. This is a pelagic-neritic fish which is found at depths between 0 and 549 m (0 and 1,801 ft).

== Biology ==
Widow rockfish feed on krill and copepods as juveniles while the adults feed on juvenile crabs, amphipods, krill, and small fishes. The juveniles are preyed upon by Chinook salmon (Oncorhynchus tshawytscha) and northern fur seals (Callorhinus ursinus). A few mature when 12 inches (300 mm) long and 3 years old. Fifty percent are mature when 12.75 inches (324 mm) long or 4 years old. Widow rockfish may live to be 16 years old. As with other rockfish fertilization is internal and the young are born live. The number of developing eggs increases from 95,000 in fish 12.75 inches (324 mm) long, to about 1,100,000 in a fish 20 inches (510 mm) long.

=== Genetics ===
A potential PCR-RFLP genetic sex marker developed for gopher rockfish does not successfully distinguish male and female widow rockfish.

== Fisheries ==
Widow rockfish fisheries are managed by NOAA Fisheries and the Pacific Fishery Management Council under the Pacific Coast Groundfish Fishery Management Plan. This allows for the issue of permits which limit entry to the fishery. There are limits to how much can be landed from each trip and there are closed seasons and areas closed to fisheries. It restricts the type of fishing gear which can be used to reduce bycatch and habitat destruction. It also provides for a trawl rationalization catch share program which sets catch limits based on the population status of each species and a share of that limit is allocated to each fisherman, this can be shared with other fishermen. The Widow rockfish is managed as part of the other rockfish complex in the Gulf of Alaska, although this species is not specifically targeted in Alaskan waters and only small amounts are landed as bycatch.

== Nutrition ==
Nutrition information for widow rockfish is as follows.

| Serving Size | 100g |
|---|---|
| === Calories === | 98 kcal |
| === Protein === | 19.4 g |
| Protein calories: 83 kcal Protein calories % : 84.5% | |
| === Fat === | 1.6 g |
| Fat calories: 14 kcal Fat calories % : 14.5% | |
| === Carbohydrate === | 0.0 g |
| Carbohydrate calories: 0 kcal Carbohydrate calories % : 0.0% | |
| Cholesterol | 46.8 mg |
| Sodium | 42.8 mg |

| Serving Size | per 100g | per 100 kcal |
|---|---|---|
| Omega 3 (EPA+DHA) | 482 mg | 569 mg |
| Vitamin B3 | 2.1 mg | 2.5 mg |
| Vitamin B6 | 0.1 mg | 0.1 mg |
| Vitamin B12 | 1.6 mcg | 1.9 mcg |
| Vitamin D | 330 IU | 390 IU |
| Vitamin E | 0 mg | 0 mg |
| Calcium | 6.6 mg | 7.8 mg |
| Magnesium | 25 mg | 30 mg |
| Phosphorus | 226 mg | 267 mg |
| Potassium | 419 mg | 495 mg |
| Selenium | 60 mcg | 71 mcg |
