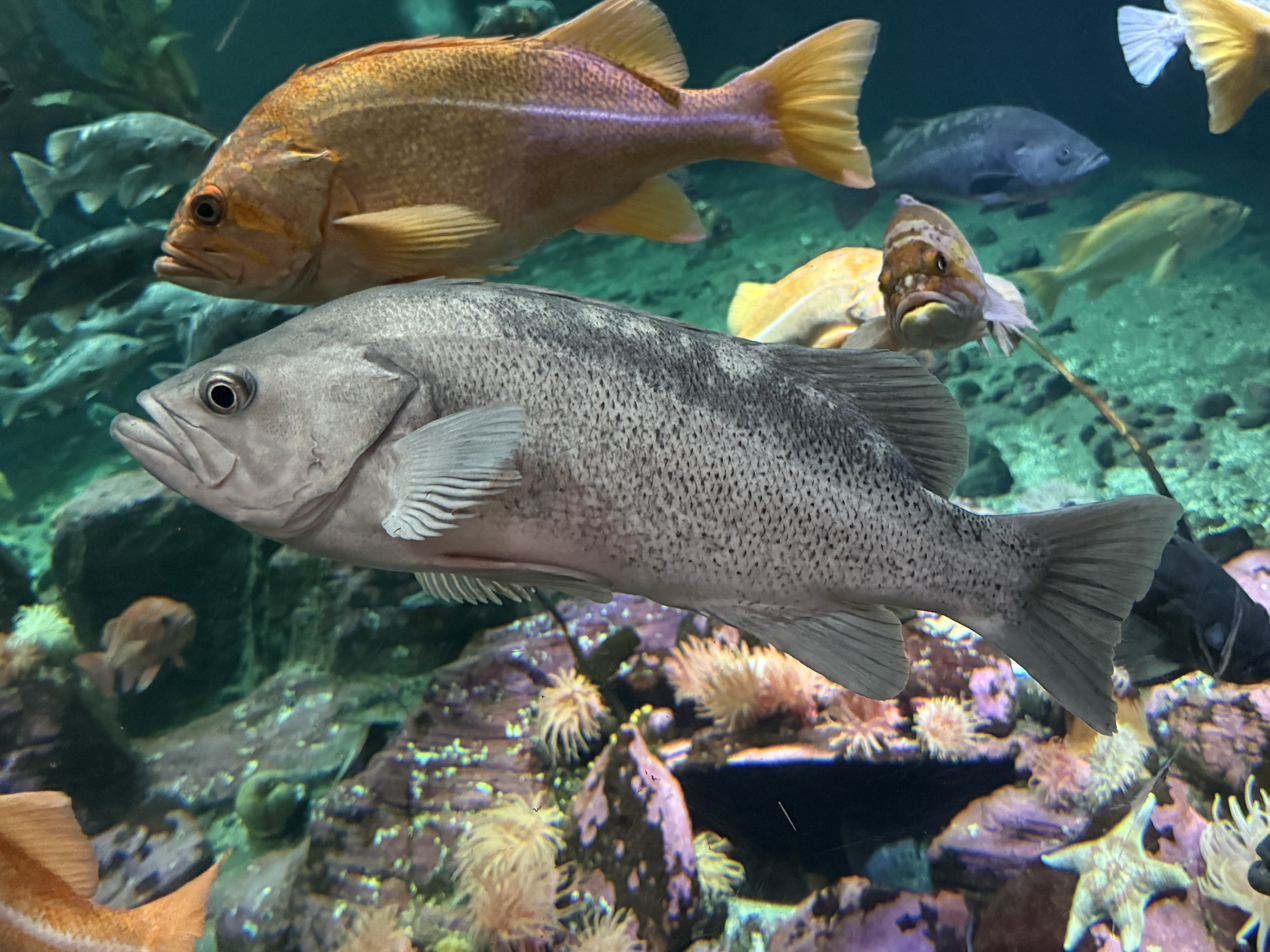
- At the Vancouver Aquarium

Scientific classification
- Kingdom: Animalia
- Phylum: Chordata
- Class: Actinopterygii
- Order: Perciformes
- Family: Scorpaenidae
- Genus: Sebastes
- Species: S. melanops

Binomial name
- Sebastes melanops Girard, 1856

Synonyms
- Sebastodes melanops (Girard, 1856); Sebastosomus simulans Gill, 1864; Sebastodes columbianus Hubbs & Schultz, 1933

= Black rockfish =

Species of fish

The black rockfish (Sebastes melanops), also known variously as the black seaperch, black bass, black rock cod, sea bass, black snapper and Pacific Ocean perch, is a species of marine ray-finned fish belonging to the subfamily Sebastinae, the rockfishes, part of the family Scorpaenidae. It is sometimes misidentified as the "red snapper".

== Taxonomy ==
The black rockfish was first formally described in 1856 by the French biologist Charles Frederic Girard with the type locality given as Cape Flattery, Washington, and Astoria, Oregon. In 1864 Theodore Gill described a new species Sebastosomus simulans from Cape Flattery and none of Girard's specimens can be traced to that locality. S. simulans has been regarded as a synonym of Sebastes melanops but there are enough differences between Gill's type and specimens of black rockfish to suggest that it is a different taxon but more study is needed to identify which taxon. Some authorities classify this species in the subgenus Sebastosomus. The specific name melanops is a compound of melanos meaning "black" and ops which means "appearance", presumed to be a reference to the blackish brown back with black spotted brownish flanks.

== Distribution ==
The black rockfish is found in the northeastern Pacific Ocean from Amchitka Island in the Aleutian Islands of Alaska to Santa Monica Bay in California. There have been two records of this species from the Iwate Prefecture of northern Japan.

== Habitat ==
This species is found in the waters of the continental shelf and is associated with reefs at depths down to 366 m (1,201 ft) but it is more typically found between 182 and 274 m (597 and 899 ft) They frequent areas of rocky reefs and live among kelp, as well as jetties and other structures.

== Description ==
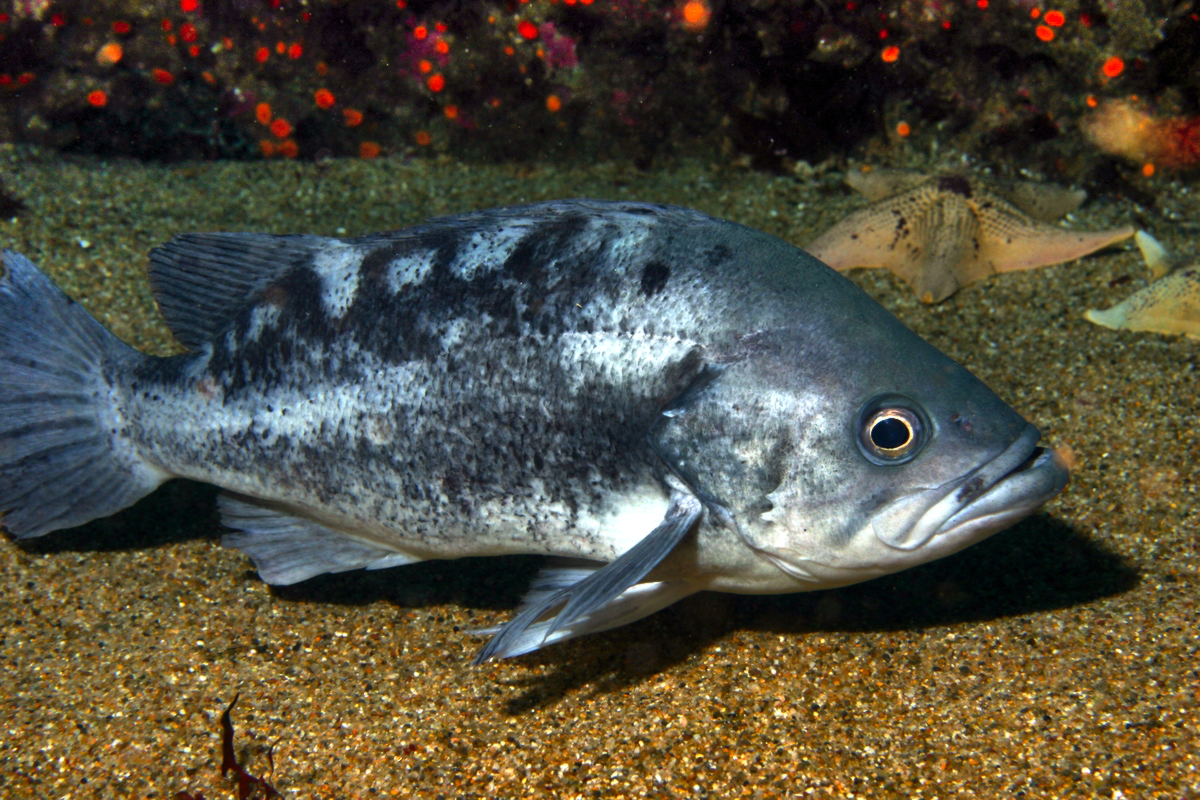
At the Monterey Bay Aquarium

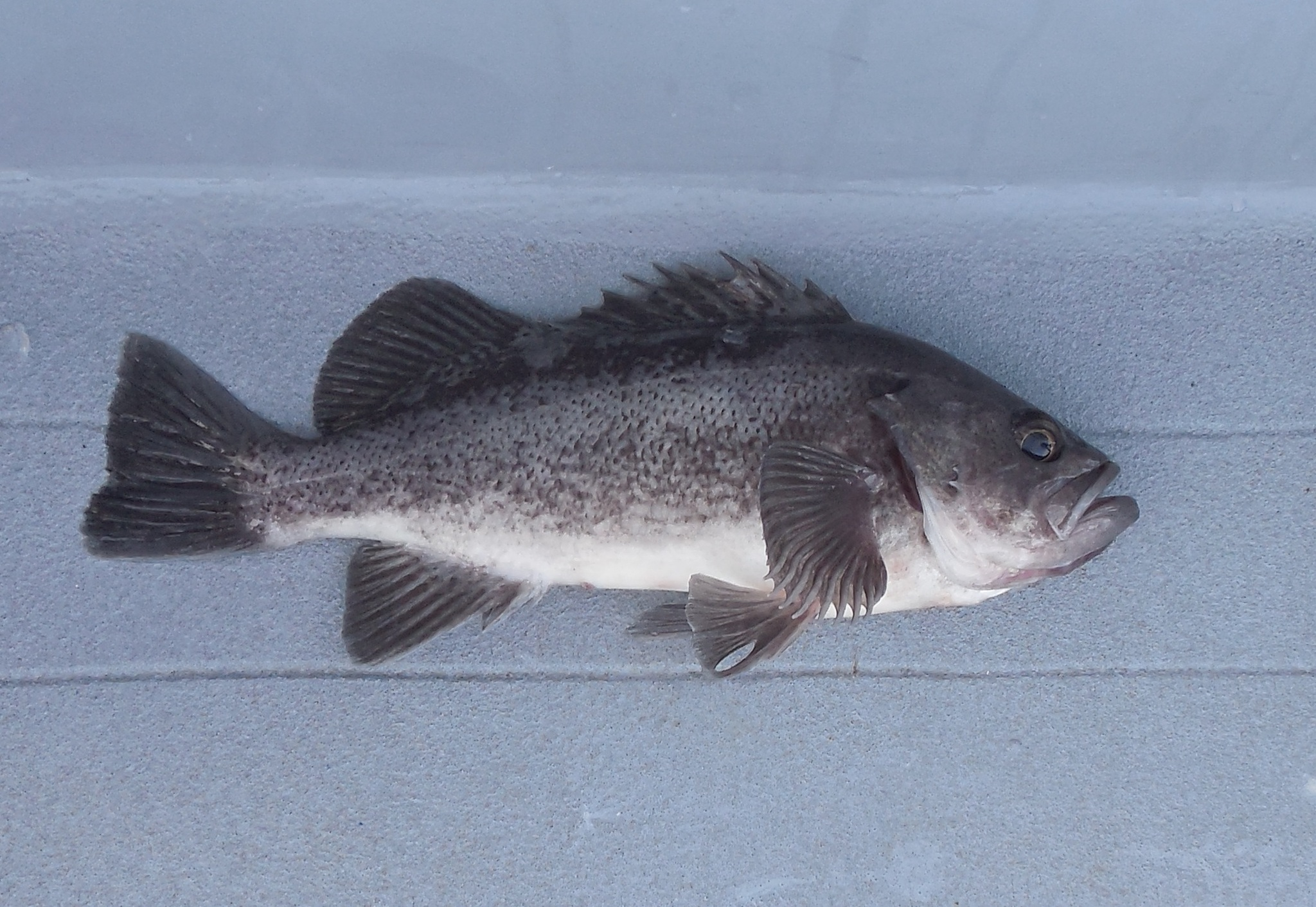
In Washington

The black rockfish attains a maximum total length of 63 cm (25 in) and has a maximum published weight of 4.8 kg (11 lb). It has a fusiform body which is deep and laterally compressed. The head is weakly spined with only the nasal spines always present while the preocular and postocular spines are normally absent and the supraocular, tympanic, coronal, parietal and nuchal spines are always absent. The head eyes are moderately large eyes with a bulge in the intraorbital space and the upper jaw reaches to the posterior margin of the eye. They have a continuous dorsal fin which contains 13-14 spines and 13-16 soft rays. The membranes between the spines are deelply incised. The anal fin has a rounded posterior profile and contains 3 spines and 7-9 soft rays. The caudal fin is truncate to emarginate.

The overall color is mottled grey and black with a black spot on the posterior of the spiny dorsal fin which fades as the fish grows. Adults can have dark stripes on the head running from the eye over the operculum. The dark color on the upper body is frequently paler than that on the flanks, leading to a mottled appearance. This dark color fades to white on the underside.

== Biology ==
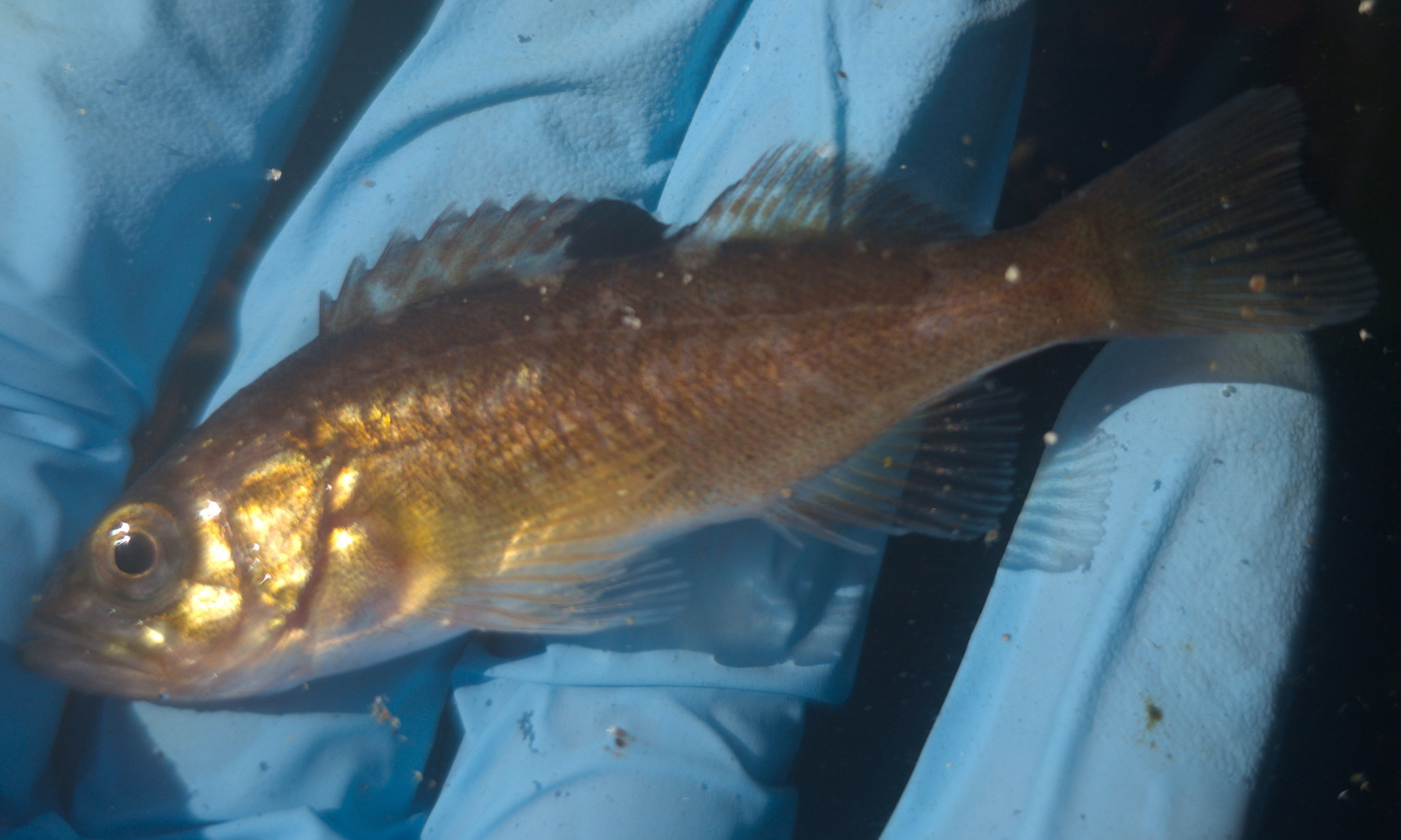
Juvenile, in California

Black rockfish are pelagic, that is, they occur on the continental shelf. Like other pelagic fish, they spend most of their time amid the water columns and are generally associated with rougher terra. This can make it somewhat inconvenient for commercial fisheries, which are often situated in nearshore, shallow water, and rocky areas (reefs). They make up an important component of nearshore fisheries in Southeastern Alaska.

Rockfish are slow-growing and extremely long-lived, and black rockfish become sexually mature only after 6 to 8 years of age. Specimen collected off Alaska have been aged to 49 years old. In addition they benefit from a low natural mortality rate, at only about 7% of the total population.

Black rockfish breed via internal fertilization, meaning that female members of the species store sperm until the development of the eggs. The phases between the start of the process and the end are separated by several months. The majority of the young are reared in late winter to early spring. Females produce between 125,000 and 1,200,000 eggs every breeding season. However, it has been noted that not all of the eggs are released every year. It has been occasionally observed that the female may absorb the eggs back into her system.

Tagging studies off Washington, Oregon, and Southeast Alaska indicate that although for the most part they spend most of their life in a small area, some long-distance travel does occur.

A potential PCR-RFLP genetic sex marker developed for gopher rockfish does not successfully distinguish male and female black rockfish.

== Fisheries ==
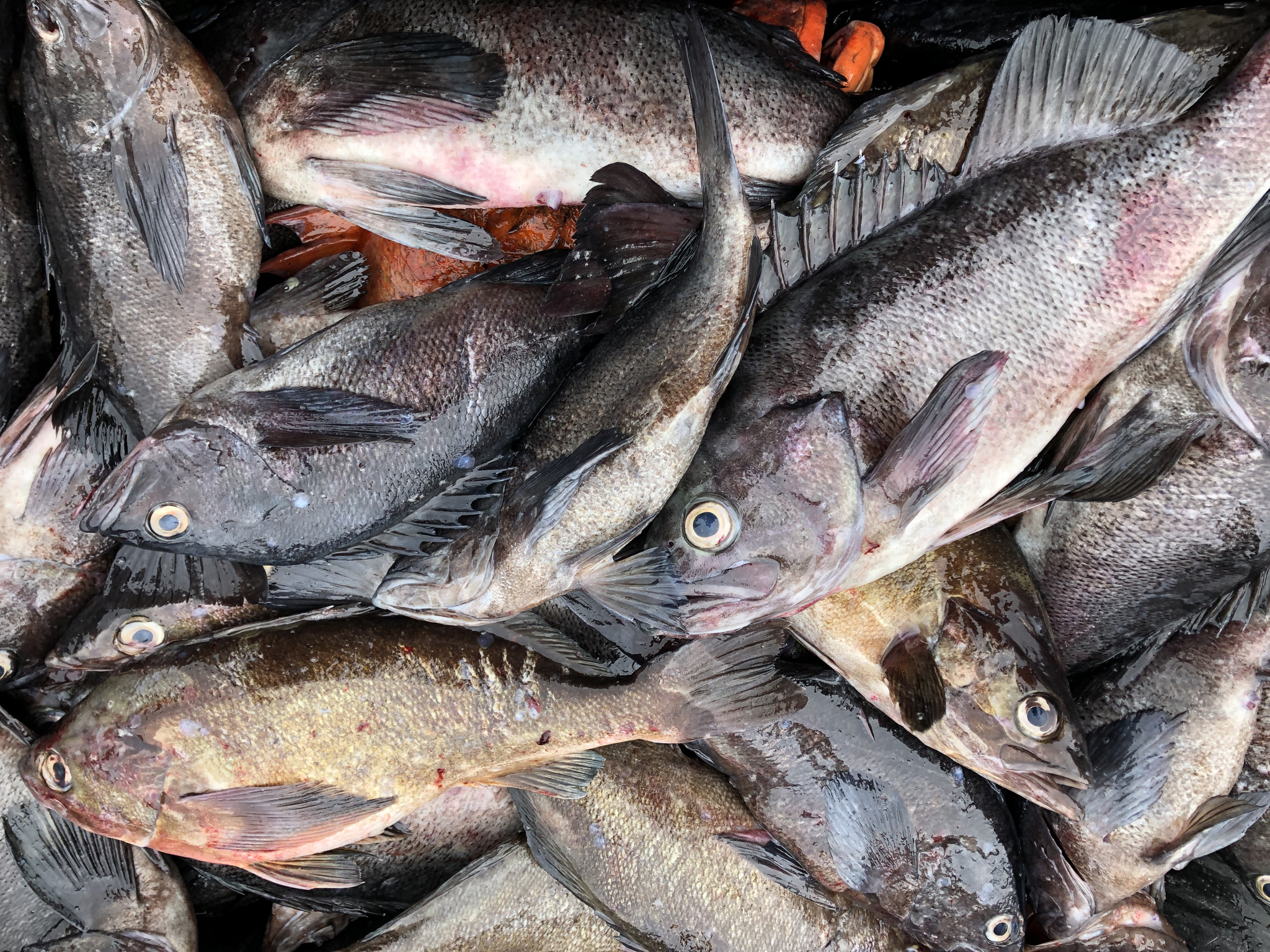
Black and widow rockfish catch, in Alaska

The black rockfish is a prime target for anglers, and a reproductive rate unusually high for its slow-growing genus makes it more resistant to fishing than its cousins, such as the yelloweye rockfish, are. They are harvested in Oregon, California, Washington, British Columbia, Alaska, and the Pacific. They are a fairly common catch along the West Coast of North America, where populations are stable.

Schools of adults often aggregate over rocky bottoms or at the sea surface, habits that make them susceptible to targeted fishing.
