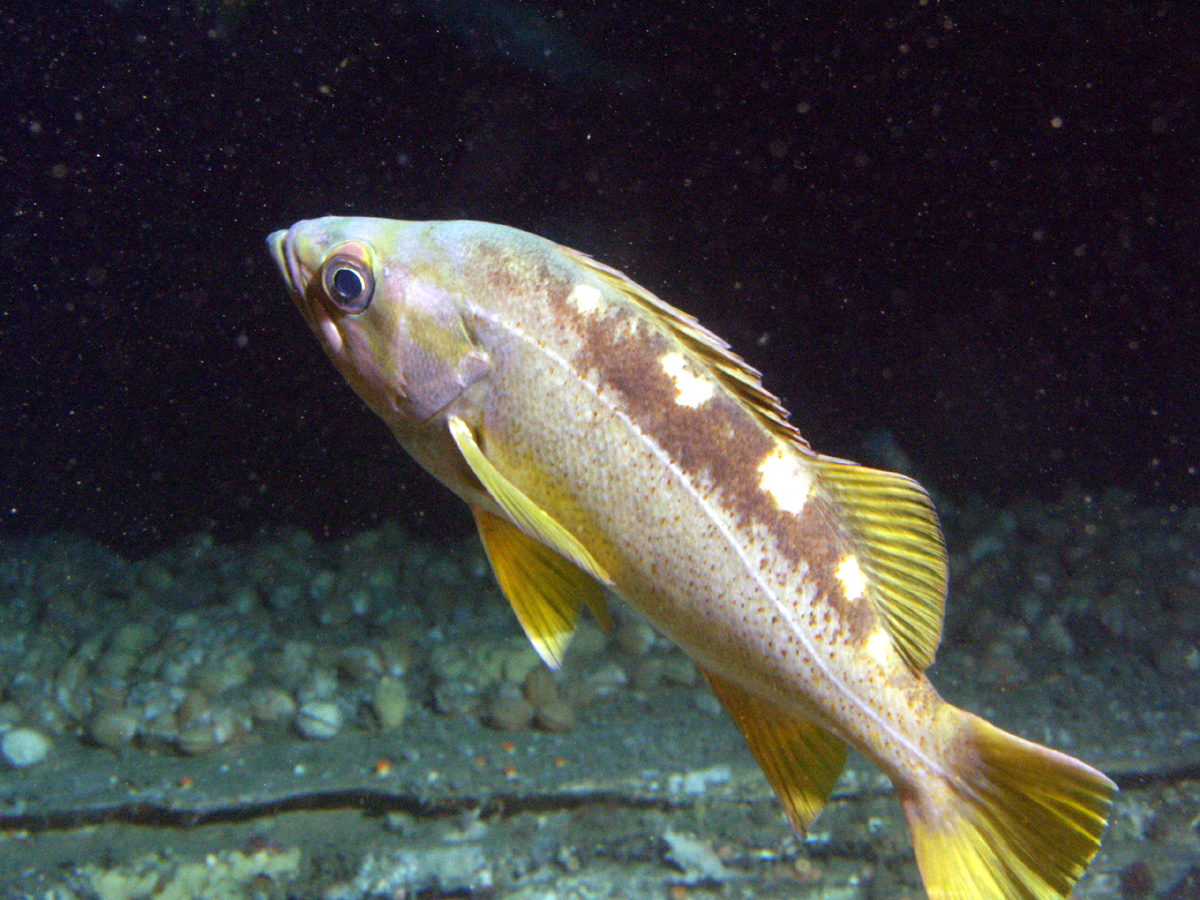

Scientific classification
- Kingdom: Animalia
- Phylum: Chordata
- Class: Actinopterygii
- Order: Perciformes
- Family: Scorpaenidae
- Genus: Sebastes
- Species: S. flavidus

Binomial name
- Sebastes flavidus (Ayres, 1862)

Synonyms
- Sebastodes flavidus Ayres, 1862

= Yellowtail rockfish =

Species of fish

The yellowtail rockfish (Sebastes flavidus), or yellowtail seaperch, is a species of marine ray-finned fish belonging to the subfamily Sebastinae, the rockfishes, part of the family Scorpaenidae. This species lives mainly off the coast of western North America from California to Alaska.

== Taxonomy ==
The yellowtail rockfish was first formally described as Sebastodes flavidus in 1862 by the American ichthyologist William Orville Ayres with the type locality given as San Francisco, California. Some authorities place this species in the subgenus Sebastosomus. The specific name flavidus means "yellowish", thought to be a reference to the "yellowish green" colour on the flanks, which Ayres said easily differentiates this species "as they lie in heaps upon the fish-stalls" from the "closely allied" black rockfish (S. melanops) Some authorities suggest that the name refers to the "bright yellow tail", but the tail was not described by Ayres.

== Description ==
The yellowtail rock fish has an elongate and compressed body which has a depth of around one-third of its of standard length. The head is comparatively short with a small mouth, positioned terminally and large eyes. It does not have robust spines on the head and those present are only the nasal spines while the preocular and parietal spines are typically absent and the supraocular, postocular, tympanic, coronal and nuchal spines are always absent. There are 13 spines and 14-16 soft rays in the dorsal fin and 3 spines and 7-9 soft rays in the anal fin. There may be an obvious knob on the symphysis of the lower jaw. This species attains a maximumtotal length of 66 cm (26 in) and a maximum total weight of 2.5 kg (5.5 lb). The overall color of the body is dark brown or greenish-brown with some of pale or bright white blotches immediately underneath the dorsal fins, fading to white below the lateral line. The caudal fin is vivid yellow and the rest of the fins are dusky yellow. The body darkens and becomes uniformly olive green and the blotches fade following capture although some reddish-brown speckling is often still present on the rear margin of each scale.

== Distribution and habitat ==
The yellowtail rockfish occurs from San Quintin, Baja California, to Kodiak Island, Alaska. This species commonly occurs over deep reefs from the surface to depths of 549 m (1,801 ft). The juveniles are often found around floats and pilings.

== Biology ==
Yellowtail rockfish attain sexual maturity when they are between three and five years old. and may live for up to 50 years. The females can produce between 50,000 and 600,000 eggs, larger females having greater fecundity. They are ovoviviparous, the eggs are fertilised internally and the females give birth to live larvae. The adults feed on shellfish, such as shrimp, and small forage fish, such as anchovies. A unique feature of this species is that it can release gas from its swimbladder and this means that when they are caught from deep they are able to avoid barotrauma that would be fatal to other fishes.

== Genetics ==
A potential PCR-RFLP genetic sex marker developed for gopher rockfish does not successfully distinguish male and female yellowtail rockfish.

== Status ==
Separate stock assessments for yellowtail rockfish in the waters off British Columbia, and the West Coast of the United States north of Cape Mendocino have estimated the stock as healthy (above the management limits) with overfishing not occurring. Yellowtail rockfish in the Gulf of Alaska were included in an "Other Rockfish" stock complex which was also estimated as not experiencing overfishing. The stock of yellowtail rockfish south of Cape Mendocino are estimated to be genetically distinct from those further north, but insufficient information was available to estimate the status of the stock in this area.

== Nutrition ==
Nutrition information for yellowtail rockfish is as follows.

Serving Size	100g
=== Calories ===	85 kcal
=== Protein ===	18.3 g
Protein calories: 78 kcal Protein calories % : 92.1%	
=== Fat ===	0.7 g
Fat calories: 7 kcal Fat calories % : 7.9%	
=== Carbohydrate ===	0.0 g
Carbohydrate calories: 0 kcal Carbohydrate calories % : 0.0%	
Cholesterol	30.5 mg
Sodium	41.8 mg

Serving Size	per 100g	per 100 kcal
Omega 3 (EPA+DHA)	274 mg	280 mg
Vitamin B3	2.4 mg	2.5 mg
Vitamin B6	0.2 mg	0.2 mg
Vitamin B12	2.4 mcg	2.5 mcg
Vitamin D	174 IU	178 IU
Vitamin E	0 mg	0 mg
Calcium	7.0 mg	7.1 mg
Magnesium	27 mg	28 mg
Phosphorus	221 mg	226 mg
Potassium	443 mg	452 mg
Selenium	80 mcg	82 mcg
