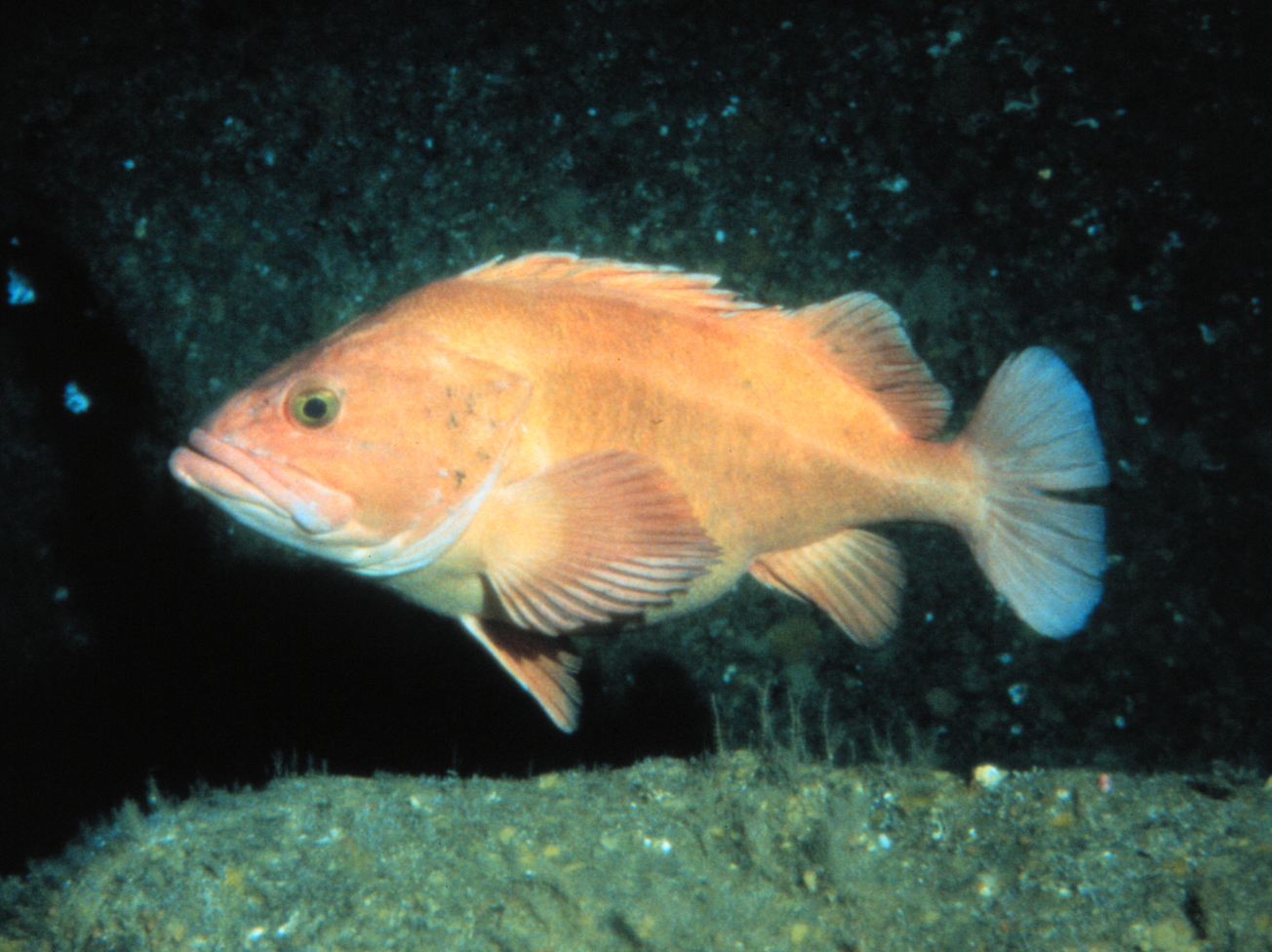
- Adult
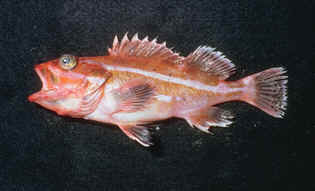
- Juvenile

Conservation status
- Threatened (ESA) Puget Sound Distinct Population Segment

- Threatened (COSEWIC)

Scientific classification
- Kingdom: Animalia
- Phylum: Chordata
- Class: Actinopterygii
- Division: Teleostei
- Order: Perciformes
- Family: Scorpaenidae
- Genus: Sebastes
- Species: S. ruberrimus

Binomial name
- Sebastes ruberrimus (Cramer, 1895)

Synonyms
- Sebastolobus ruberrimus Cramer, 1895; Sebastodes ruberrimus (Cramer, 1895); Sebastes ruber Ayres, 1854

= Yelloweye rockfish =

Species of fish

The yelloweye rockfish (Sebastes ruberrimus) is a species of marine ray-finned fish belonging to the subfamily Sebastinae, the rockfishes, part of the family Scorpaenidae and one of the biggest members of the genus Sebastes. Its name derives from its coloration. It is also locally known as "red snapper," not to be confused with the warm-water Atlantic species Lutjanus campechanus that formally carries the name red snapper. The yelloweye is one of the world's longest-lived fish species, and is cited to live to a maximum of 114 to 120 years of age. As they grow older, they change in color, from reddish in youth, to bright orange in adulthood, to pale yellow in old age. Yelloweye live in rocky areas and feed on small fish and other rockfish. They reside in the East Pacific and range from Baja California to Dutch Harbor in Alaska.

Yelloweye rockfish are prized for their meat, and were declared overfished in 2002, at which time a survey determined that their population, which had been in decline since the 1980s, was just 7–13% of numbers before commercial fishing of the species began. Because of the slow reproductive age of the species, recovery of the species is difficult, and liable to last decades, even with the harshest restrictions; Washington state, for example, maintains a quota of under 1000 individuals per year. The stock in inside waters is listed as "threatened" while the outside stock was declared overfished and is subject to a rebuilding plan.

== Taxonomy ==
The yelloweye rockfish was first formally described in 1854 as Sebastes ruber by the American physician and ichthyologist William Orville Ayres with the type locality given as San Francisco, California. Later, in 1895, the American zoologist and teacher Frank Cramer described a new species as Sebastolobus ruberrimus. Cramer's name is newer than Ayres's and should be the junior synonym but became more widely known and has been used as the valid name of this taxon through prevailing usage. Some authorities place this species in the monotypic subgenus Sebastopyr. The specific name ruberrimus means "very red," a reference to the uniform red color of this species as adults.

=== Stock structure ===
Genetic analysis has found three distinct populations of yelloweye rockfish: the outside coastal population off the coast of Alaska, British Columbia, and the West Coast of the United States; an inside population in the Salish Sea, including the San Juan Islands, Strait of Georgia, and Puget Sound; and third stock in Hood Canal.

== Distribution and habitat ==
The yelloweye rockfish has been recorded all along the East Pacific, from Umnak Island and Prince William Sound, Alaska, to Ensenada, Baja California.

They are typically found in deeper, rocky-bottomed areas; in fact, they often spend their entire lifetime on a single rock pile. They are typically found in the 28-to-215-fathom (51-to-393 m) range, although specimen have been reported up to a maximum depth of 260 fathoms (475 m).

== Description ==
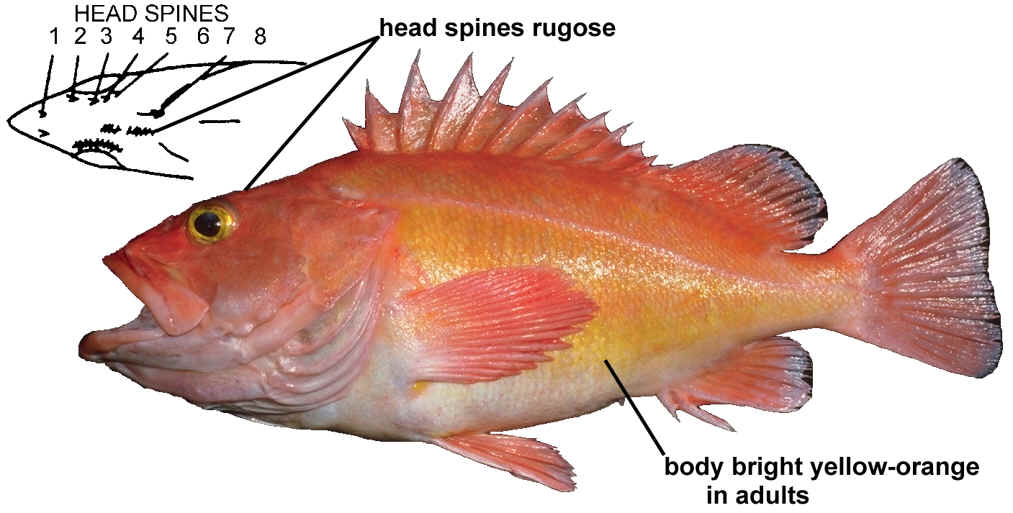
Species identification diagram

The yelloweye rockfish is colored red on its back, orange to yellow on the sides, and black on the fin tips. Its young are typically under 28 cm (11 in) in length, and differ from the adults in that they have two reddish-white stripes along their belly, and are often red. Because of the distinct difference in coloration between juveniles and adults, they were considered separate species for a long time. Its head spines are exceptionally strong. They grow to a maximum length of 36 in (0.9 m) and a weight of 17.5 kg (39 lb).

== Longevity ==
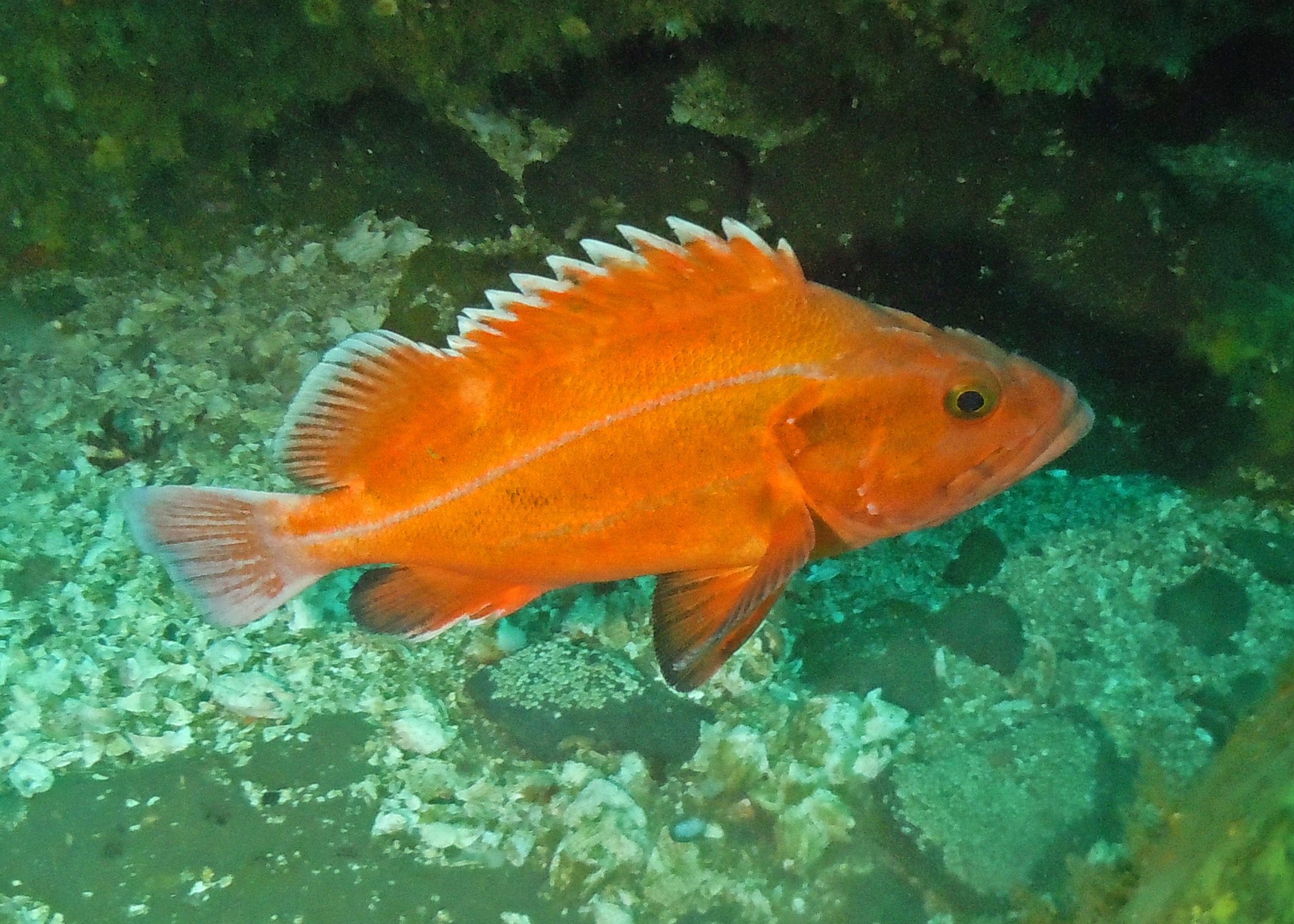
Subadult

A large yelloweye rockfish caught in Alaska

Yelloweye rockfish live to be extremely old, even for their unusually long-lived genus. They average 114 to 120 years of age; the oldest ones reach as much as 147 years. They fade from bright orange to a paler yellow as they grow in age. They are exceptionally slow developing as well, not reaching maturity until they are around 20 years of age.

== Diet ==
Larval yelloweye feed on diatoms, dinoflagellates, crustaceans, tintinnids, and cladocerans, and juveniles consume copepods and krill of all life stages. Adults eat demersal invertebrates and small fishes, including other species of rockfish.

== Fishing impacts and stock status ==
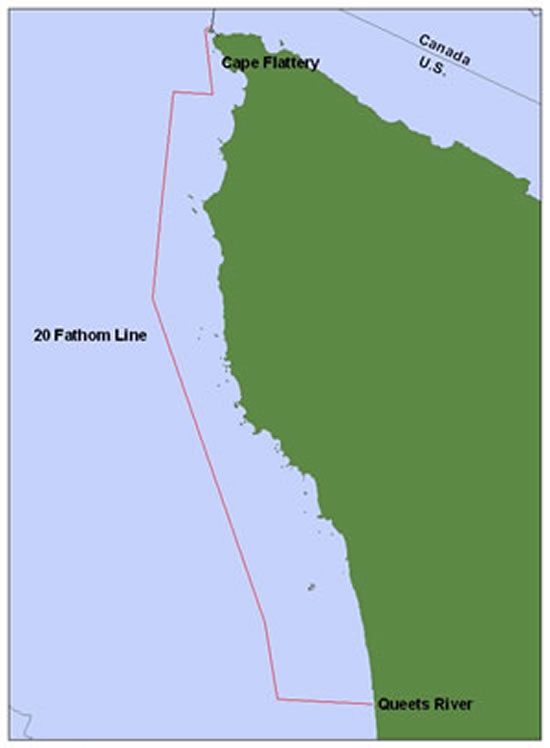
The 20 fathoms (37 m) coastal limit for catching yelloweye, as defined at the coast of Washington state. Other states have a similar policy to protect the species.

Due to their large size and fillet quality, yelloweye rockfish are a highly prized species in both commercial and recreational fisheries. Historically, yelloweye are taken in by trawl, line, and sports gear. Fishing of the species using trawls was restricted following a 2000 resolution to keep trawlers out of their primary habitats.

=== Survival during catch and release ===
Yelloweye brought to the surface by fishing boats tend to die of decompression barotrauma and temperature shock. According to the Alaska Department of Fish and Game, the fish is liable to die if brought to the surface from a depth of over 10 fathoms (60 ft; 18 m).

Recent federal research by John Hyde at National Oceanic and Atmospheric Administration's (NOAA's) Southwest Fisheries Science Center in San Diego indicates that, after a yelloweye is brought to the surface, devices which bring these fish back to 45 meters below the sea surface may allow the fish to recompress and survive, analogous to "an ambulance ride home after an angler catches it." The federal Pacific Fishery Management Council (PFMC) may begin considering proposals to compensate anglers for using these devices, as a means to restore fish stocks.

Yelloweye rockfish that are released after recompression have survival rates of over 80%, when caught from depths of up to 174 meters.

=== Stock assessment ===
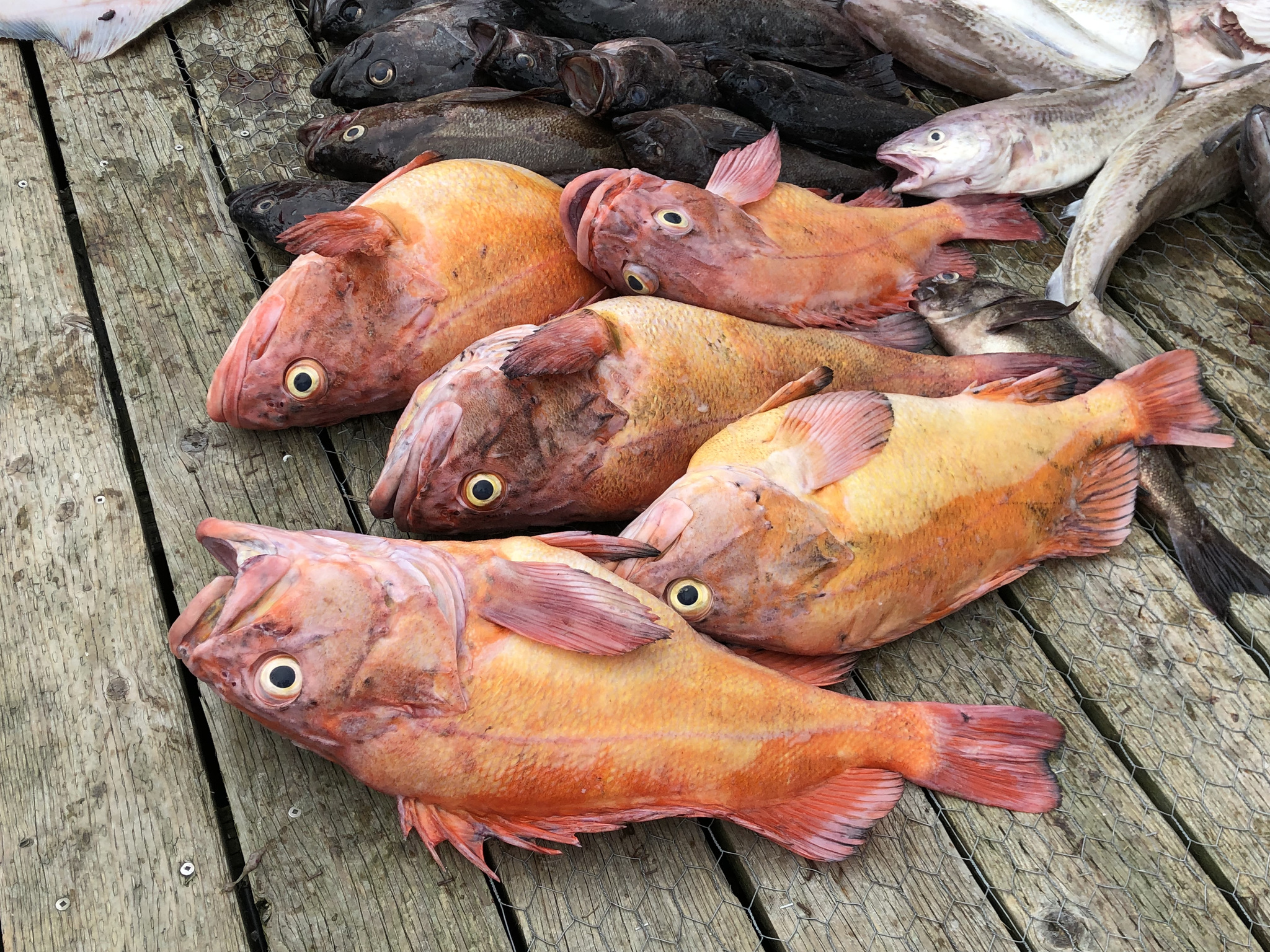
Yelloweye caught in Alaska

A stock assessment of the species, which incorporated data gathered from northern California and Oregon, was conducted in 2001. The study concluded the fish's numbers are just 7% of what they would be without human intervention in northern California, and a slightly higher 13% in Oregon. The assessment also showed a 30-year decline in numbers. These numbers are far below the 25% threshold at which a fish is labeled "overfished."

The formal rebuilding analysis of the species initially estimated that recovery would take decades, as much as 100 years of recovery. This is associated with the fact that they do not reach sexual maturity until they are 10 to 20 years of age. A total of 13.5 metric tons (29,800 lb) of yelloweye catch were allowed coastwide in 2002. This limit is set so that fisheries can potentially catch yelloweye if they are caught accidentally, but prevents the targeted fishing of the species. The Washington Department of Fish and Wildlife and Oregon Department of Fish and Wildlife, meanwhile, prohibited retention of yelloweye rockfish caught by recreational fisheries. Commercial retention of the rockfish is prohibited except for a small 300 lb (136 kg) limit, to allow yelloweye caught dead to be retained. California's sportfishing regulations prohibit the take or possession of yelloweye rockfish (also cowcod and bronzespotted rockfish.)

As time passed, the restrictions on fishing became stricter; the 2009 Washington state quota is just 6,000 pounds (2.7 t), fewer than 1000 fish. State departments are prepared to close down anglers hunting halibut to protect the species if the situation becomes dire.

A 2017 stock assessment covering the subset of the offshore population off the coasts of California, Oregon, and Washington estimated the population to have increased from a low point of 14.2% of unexploited levels in 2000 to 28.4% in 2017. The updated rebuilding analysis associated with the 2017 stock assessment estimated that with the status-quo harvest policy, the stock had a high probability of being rebuilt by 2027.

Yelloweye rockfish in the inside waters of the Salish Sea are designated as a "Puget Sound/Georgia Basin yelloweye Distinct Population Segment" which was listed as "threatened" under the Endangered Species Act in 2010 and is subject to a recovery plan.
