= Quartermaster Harbor =

Coordinates: 47.3793°N 122.4620°W

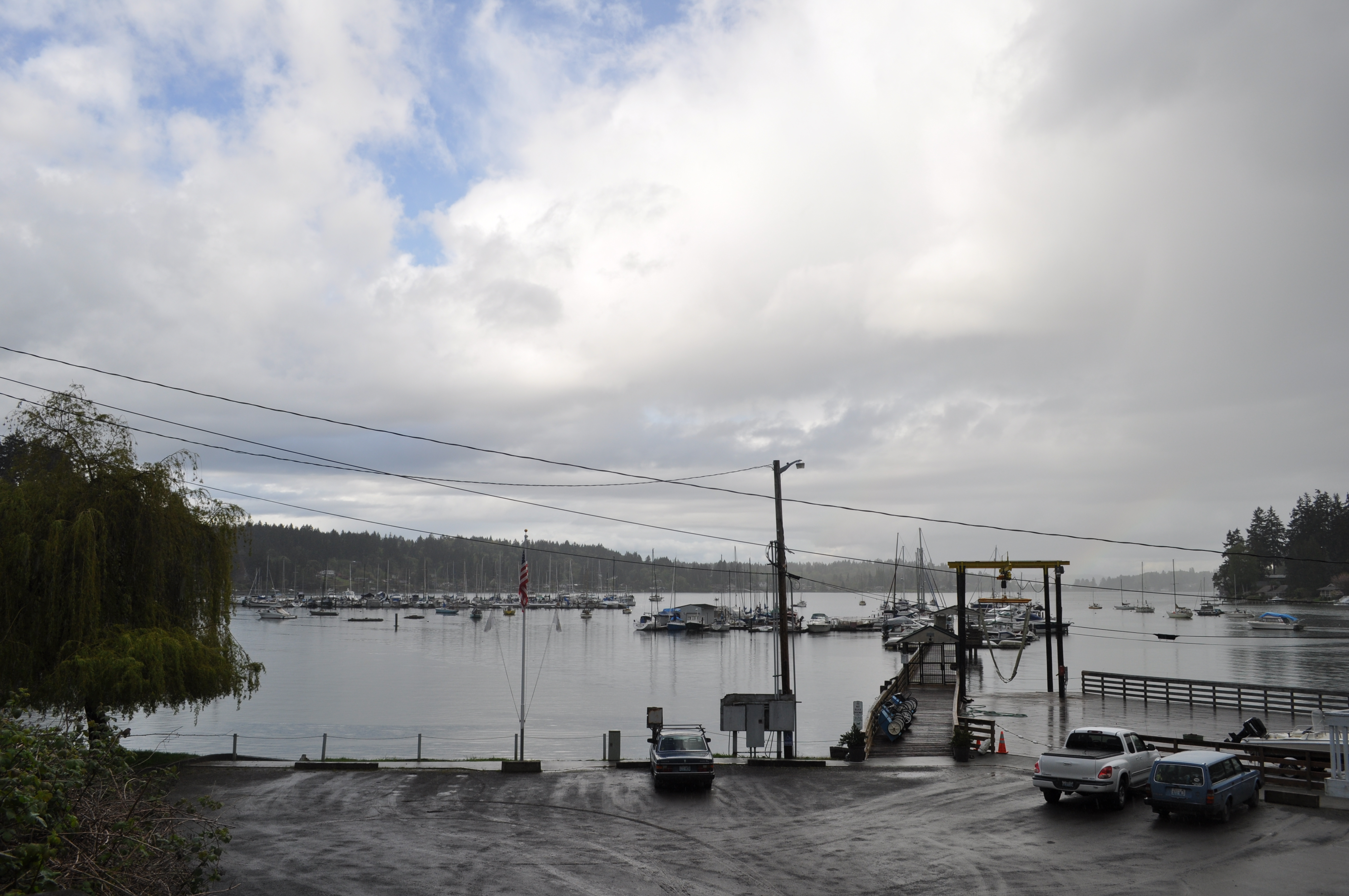
Quartermaster Harbor from Burton

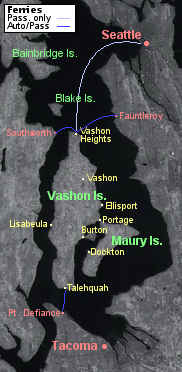
Quartermaster Harbor is between Vashon Island and Maury Island

Quartermaster Harbor is a small harbor located in southern Puget Sound, in Vashon Island, Washington state.

== Geographic description ==
Quartermaster Harbor is formed by Vashon Island on the west and Maury Island on the east. It opens about 0.8-mile (1.3 km) east of the Tahlequah, Washington ferry landing at the south end of Vashon Island, with the entrance between Neill Point on Vashon Island and Piner Point on Maury Island. It is a nearly five-mile-long inlet, about a half-mile wide, that extends about 3.5 miles (5.6 km) north between the islands. It then turns east into the bay at Dockton, swings north around Burton Peninsula, past Portage and turns west, ending in the "inner harbor" at Burton.

The harbor is sheltered and has no commercial marine traffic. The harbor itself is shallow, with a maximum depth of about ten meters at high tide. The bottom is sand and mud with abundant shellfish. Evergreen trees line the shores and climb the hills above Quartermaster Harbor, with heights rising to over 400 feet (120 m) on both islands. There are good anchorages as well as several places to moor in the north end of the harbor.

== Marine Life ==
Quartermaster Harbor hosts the largest spawning population of Pacific herring in south Puget Sound, and is also a major spawning area for surf smelt. The narrow strip of land between the two islands contains a small saltwater marsh. It is part of the Washington State Department of Natural Resources Maury Island Environmental Aquatic Reserve.

Due to the high concentration of forage fish and shellfish, the harbor is a major wintering area for 35 bird species. The most abundant bird is the Western Grebe, which totals eight percent of Washington's wintering population. There are hundreds of scoters and other diving sea ducks that feed on the shellfish during the winter. The grebes, loons, mergansers, diving sea ducks, gulls, and dabbling ducks, in addition to other species, make a total of about 3,000 individual birds wintering there annually.

== Boating activity ==
The harbor is home to Quartermaster Yacht Club and Quartermaster Marina, both of which house many different private motor and sailing yachts and smaller boats. This harbor is also the location of the main practice areas of Vashon Island Junior Crew.

== History ==
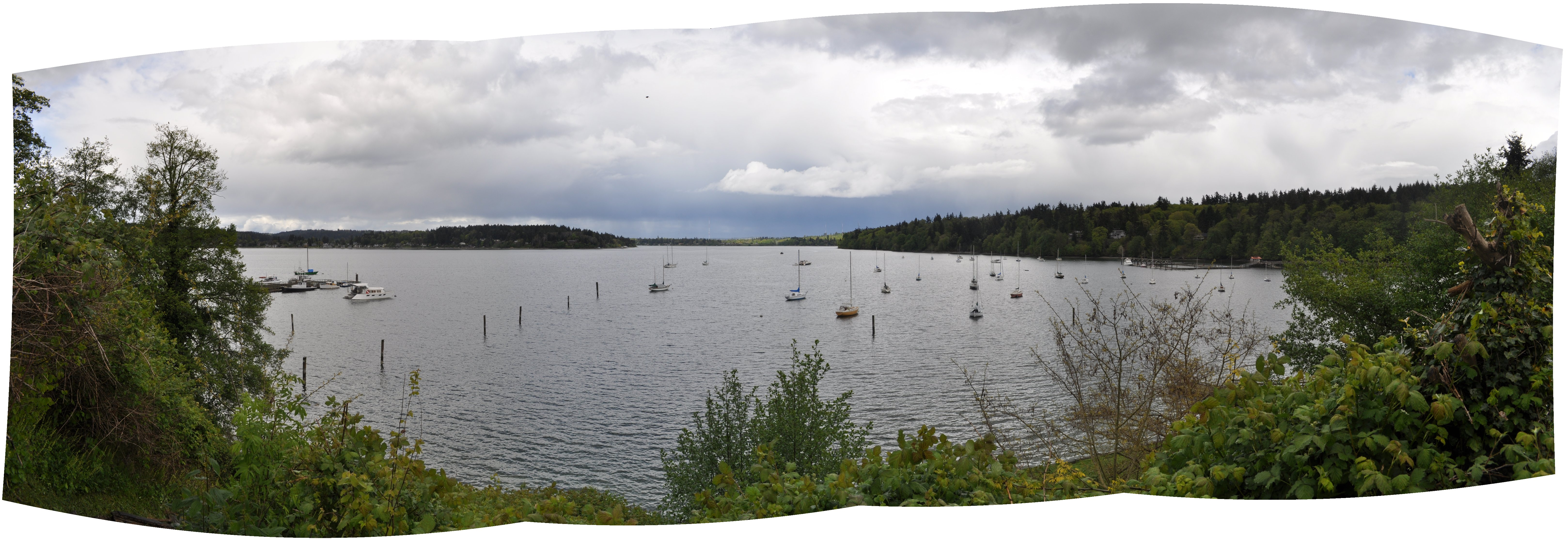
Quartermaster Harbor from Dockton.

=== Source of name ===
Quartermaster Harbor was named by Charles Wilkes during the Wilkes Expedition of 1838–1842. Wilkes chose the name because he had named a great number of other features in the vicinity for quartermasters and other petty officers of the expedition. Places in the area named for quartermasters include Piner, Neill, Dalco, Sanford, Southworth, Williams, Henry, Pully, Robinson, and Henderson.

=== Drydock and marine construction ===
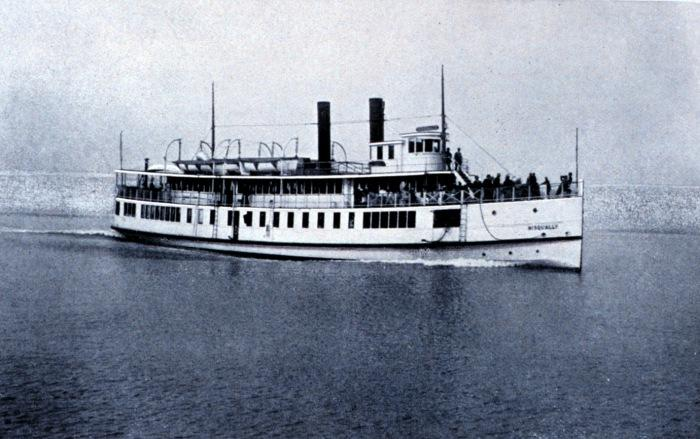
Nisqually, built at Martinolich Yard, Dockton, 1911

Quartermaster Harbor once held one of the largest drydocks in Puget Sound. In 1892, the structure, originally built to be installed at Port Townsend, was installed at Quartermaster Harbor instead. Measuring 325 feet (99 m) long and 102 feet (31 m) wide, the drydock could lift several large ships at a time. The dock remained in place until 1909.

Over the years a number of vessels were also built at the nearby shipyard of John Martinolich, at Dockton on Maury Island. These included the propeller steamers Vashon (1905), Verona (1910), Nisqually (later renamed Astorian) and Calista, both built in 1911, Florence J. (1914), F.G. Reeves, (1916), Vashona (later renamed Sightseer) (1921), and the ferry Whidby (1923).

Launchings did not always go well. Florence J. rolled over and sank on the first launching attempt. Shipyard operations eventually ceased in the 1912.

== See also ==
SS Charles W. Wetmore (an unusual vessel that used the drydock at least once)

== Websites ==
- Quartermaster Marina
- Vashon Island Rowing Club
