= Environmental issues in Puget Sound =

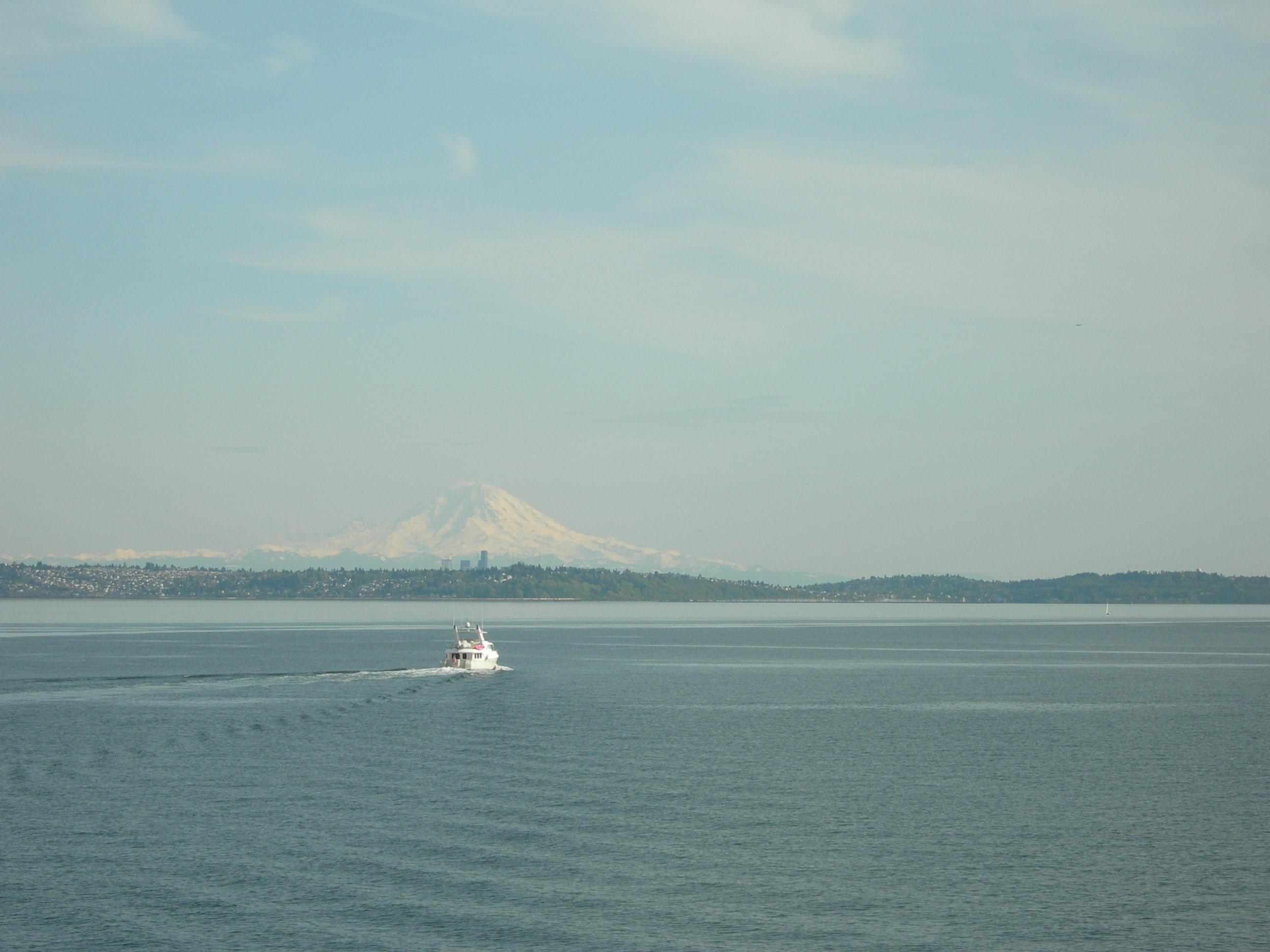
Mount Rainier and Puget Sound

Puget Sound is a deep inlet of the Pacific Ocean in Washington, extending south from the Strait of Juan de Fuca through Admiralty Inlet. It was explored and named by Captain George Vancouver for his aide, Peter Puget, in 1792.

The ninth Puget Sound Update, from the Puget Sound Action Team reports that:

"Puget Sound has biological resources which include all of the living organisms which inhabit the marine waters and shorelines. These biological resources are plankton, invertebrates, fish, birds, mammals, and aquatic vegetation, including species that are either residential or migratory."

The abundance of creatures and foliage allowed for the native peoples of the area to thrive and prosper by harvesting it. Many of the problems of Puget Sound originated from explorers and trappers hunting and killing the indigenous species off of which the natives thrived and prospered. In the past 30 years there has been a large recession in the populations of the species which inhabit Puget Sound. The decrease has been seen in the populations of: forage fish, salmonids, bottom fish, marine birds, harbor porpoise and orcas. This decline is attributed to environmental issues in Puget Sound. Because of this population decline, there have been changes to the fishery practices, and an increase in petitioning to add species to the Endangered Species Act (ESA). There has also been an increase in recovery and management plans for many different area species.

The cause of these environmental issues are, toxic contamination, eutrophication (low oxygen due to excess nutrients), and near shore habitat changes. Puget Sound has been affected by urbanization and the toxic pollutants it produces. As a government document regarding this issue says, "A major contributor of these toxic pollutants entering the Sound is the stormwater that runs off our highways, roads, driveways, roofs, parking lots, disturbed soils, and other developed surfaces." They also talk about the loss of habitat. In the last 125 years, Puget Sound has lost or damaged 70 percent of their habitats including the salt marshes, eelgrass beds and the estuaries.

== Puget Sound industry ==
Puget Sound, Washington is a body of water lying east of Admiralty Inlet, through which ocean waters reach inland some 50 miles (80 km) from the Pacific Coast to complex and intricate system of channels, inlets, estuaries, embayments and islands. Industries in this area include aerospace, military, biotechnology, fishing, electronics, computers, forest products, marine industries, telecommunications, transportation and other commerce industries.

Due to improper storage methods for dangerous chemicals, such as arsenic, areas of soil and aquatic land in Puget Sound are being managed under the Comprehensive Environmental Response, Compensation, and Liability Act (CERCLA).

Standards for the storage and discharge of industry chemicals have improved, and Puget Sound remains vital to the industries that depend upon it, such as shipping ports. Ports in Washington are diverse. Governed as municipalities, the ports operate shipping terminals, marinas, docks, and associated infrastructure, such as roads, railroads and parks. The fastest-growing part of Washington ports is industrial development.

== Urbanization and population ==
The Puget Sound region has been rapidly growing. According to the Puget Sound Regional Council (PSRC), a board that plans for growth in the four central counties of the area (Kitsap, Pierce, Snohomish and King counties), the combined population of these counties was nearly 3.4 million residents in 2003.

Times have changed since the 1970s, when a billboard in Seattle read "the last person to leave Seattle please turn out the lights". Between 1970 and 2000, the Puget Sound region's population increased by 1.3 million people. The 12-county Puget Sound region, including Seattle and Tacoma, has quadrupled to four million people since the 1950s, and the state predicts one million more residents by 2025. The PSRC predicts that between 2000 and 2020 the region will increase by 1.7 million people. Another change the region faces involves the demographics of its population. The segment of its population ages 65 and older is projected to increase by 150 percent, making up 17 percent of the total population by 2040.

The expansion of Microsoft and Boeing has spurred an economic growth in the area. This has major environmental implications, including pollution runoff and the altering of important shorelines. "One-third of Puget Sound shoreline has already been altered".

Under the Growth Management Act (GMA), local governments plan, coordinate and manage for growth in Washington, while protecting natural resources and public interests. The GMA requires local governments to develop long-term comprehensive plans for land uses in their jurisdictions. Plans must be coordinated with surrounding counties and be approved by a regional board. Finally, as part of the GMA, local governments must address sensitive fish and wildlife areas through Critical Area Ordinances (CAOs).

== Hood Canal hypoxia ==
Hood Canal is a fjord off Puget Sound. Hypoxia is a low-oxygen condition occurring in Hood Canal. One overriding factor of this is the underwater topography of the canal. While the shallowest part of the canal is its entrance, where the ledge, or sill, of the canal measures only 150 feet (46 m) deep, the deepest parts of the canal are more than 600 feet (180 m) deep. The Hood Canal Dissolved Oxygen Program (HCDOP) and the United States Geological Service (USGS) are studying Hood Canal circulation, trying to model the tidal circulations and salinity distribution patterns between the canal and Admiralty Inlet. Other factors that, when combined with the constrictive shape, could also influence hypoxia in Hood Canal are:

1. Pacific Ocean marine water may be entering with a lower oxygen content than historically received.
2. Marine water may be entering at a density lighter than needed to flush out Hood Canal quickly or effectively.
3. Riverine freshwater input has changed—increased or decreased—altering the stratification (water) of Hood Canal marine life.
4. Organic material input may have increased.
5. Light input may have increased (algae growth increases with light, as well as organic nutrient input).
6. Wind currents may have altered water column circulation (Atmospheric circulation).

The picture surrounding hypoxia in Hood Canal is complex; research models point to more than one contributing factor: Nutrient level. Nutrient level is a large issue due to the human impact. The supply of nutrients, primarily nitrates, to the euphotic zone is thought to impact levels of dissolved oxygen. Nutrients feed algae, which under the right conditions, "bloom" and then die and decompose; the entire process requires a large amount of oxygen. This decreases the oxygen in the water column, lowering the dissolved oxygen level.

There are both natural and man-made sources of nutrients. The primary natural source is in ocean water that flushes Hood Canal. Man-made sources include leaking septic systems, storm water runoff, agriculture and various other sources causing nutrient pollution. The presence of nutrients leads to algae growth, which consumes oxygen when the algae die and decompose, contributing to the low oxygen conditions in these waters.

Another factor mentioned by the HCDOP is the influence of the ocean water. The ocean water that enters Hood Canal is like most estuaries: fresh, warm water flows out at the surface and is replaced by cold, salty water at depth. The cold, salty ocean water that enters Hood Canal comes into Puget Sound from the open ocean and has not recently been in contact with the atmosphere. As a result, this water is initially somewhat depleted in oxygen.

Oxygen levels will fluctuate throughout the year; this is due to seasonal changes in nutrient availability, solar radiation, and water column stratification (layers of water of different density, temperature, and salinity). Low oxygen conditions are at their worst in the late summer, after several months of limited flushing and maximum plankton production near the surface. In some years, oxygen becomes sufficiently depleted that animals cannot survive. These kills may occur either locally or over a wide area.

== Combined Sewage Overflow ==
Combined sewage overflow (CSO) occurs often in the Puget Sound. CSO occur during rain storms when runoff combines with raw sewage, overflowing pipes and carrying pollutants, harmful pathogens, and excess nutrients directly into Puget Sound. This is a threat to the biodiversity of marine wildlife as it degrades/damages the marine habitat. Due to high amounts of excess nutrients and water disturbance, there are fewer number of benthic invertebrate species found near CSO outfalls. One of the nutrients found in excess amounts is Nitrogen, which can cause low oxygen level. Excess nitrogen can causes algae blooms which leads to low oxygen level which is dangerous for marine organism that need oxygen. Furthermore, at the outfall the output disturbs the soils, which makes the water more turbid. Turbid water can increase the number of pathogens in the water. Many fishes and shellfish can be affected by some pathogens that are naturally found in Puget Sound. High turbidity can decrease light penetration which can decrease food sources for fishes. If the turbidity is high enough it can kill fishes and/or affect reproduction and growth. Other pollutants carried by the runoff can have direct harm on many marine organisms and pollute the soils. For example, heavy metal buildup can cause physiological and reproductive harm. For example, lead in river otters and spotted sandpiper affect their reproduction. Furthermore, build-up in pollutants has been found to affect fish growth. To reach standards stated in the Clean Water Act, Washington State must have a long-term CSO Control Plan so that 1 or fewer overflow events occur on average in a year.

=== King County: CSO Long-term Control Plan and Integrated Plan Alternative ===
King County, Washington, US, has two plans to help improve CSO impacts on the environment: CSO Long-term Control Plan and the Integrated Plan Alternative. The Integrated Plan presents management of both runoff and sewage overflow, while the Long-term Control Plan focuses on decreasing sewage overflow. At various locations, King County monitors and assesses the water quality at CSO outfall locations. Between 1979 and 2012 King County working with the City of Seattle has been able to decrease CSO by about 1.5 billion gallons. The Integrated Plan Alternative is implemented by Seattle Public Utilities and expected to be completed by 2025. The purpose of the plan is to reduce pollutants entering the water. It has suggested three methods: (1) increasing the number of streets that are swept; (2) build a water quality facility in South Park to remove pollutants; and (3) maintaining existing rain gardens and/or natural drainage systems. The CSO Long-term Control Plan is to be completed by 2030. There are four main strategies in the plan to decrease CSO impact on the environment: (1) underground storage tanks/tunnel; (2) Wet Weather treatment stations; (3) Green Stormwater Infrastructure (GSI); and (4) repairing/replacing existing outfalls/pipes. Underground storage tanks/tunnels are being built in North Beach, Magnolia, West Seattle, and Rainer Valley. Wet Weather treatment stations are being built in Elliot West and Henderson/MLK. GSI are being built at Barton, Highland Park, and South Green Park. At Salmon Bay (Ballard) and Leschi (Lake Washington) old outfalls and pipes are being replaced or repaired. The underground storage tank in Magnolia will be able to hold 1.5 million gallon during CSO events, which will eventually flow to the CSO treatment center in Smith Cove. The architecture of the facility was structured to collect and filter runoff by creating a rain garden. It helps clean water and provides habitat for wildlife such as birds, bees, and butterflies.

=== King County: Sediment Management Plan ===
King County has decreased the CSO discharge into Puget Sound, however soils are still polluted due to past CSO discharges. The Sediment Management Plan was first created in the 1990s to deal with soil pollution at CSO outfalls. The cleanup methods include capping, dredging, and source control/natural recovery. CSO outfalls of concern include the sites at Duwamish/Diagonal, King Street, Hanford Street, Lander Street, Brandon Street, Denny Way, Norfolk Street, and Pier 53-55. At Denny Way CSO outfall, the polluted soil was removed through dredging and then improved the habitat by refilling the sea floor with clean soils to mimic surround area.

== Aquatic vegetation ==
According to the 2007 Puget Sound Update:

Aquatic vegetation is a key component of the near shore environment that supports the ecosystem through primary production and by providing habitat to numerous species of fish, invertebrates, birds, and mammals.

Puget Sound is home to a diverse assemblage of aquatic plants and algae, each with unique habitat requirements. Major threats to submerged aquatic vegetation include physical disturbance, loss of water clarity, and excessive nutrients.

Known to be important ecosystem components that are sensitive to anthropogenic stressors, eelgrass and kelp species are commonly recognized indicators of aquatic vegetation health.

There are twenty six species of kelp which grow along Washington’s shorelines, which makes it one of the highest sites of kelp diversity in the world. Changes in the oceans kelp have direct effect on other species. This is particularly due to the unique three-dimensional habitats that the plants provide for invertebrates, fish, birds, and mammals. Widespread loss of kelp throughout Puget Sound would have repercussions for the marine ecosystem as a whole.

Eelgrass (Zostera marina) is an underwater grass that thrives in marine and estuarine water bottoms and spreads through rhizomes, or roots. It has been estimated by the Washington Department of Natural Resources (DNR) that Puget Sound is occupied by approximately 26,000 acres (110 km^{2}) of eelgrass. Research has shown that eelgrass beds in Puget Sound can be found in two different habitats: flats, which can be described as either large, shallow bays or small "pocket" beaches, and fringe beds along steep shorelines. Beds of eelgrass provide a vital link in the nearshore foodweb, creating underwater forests for biota such as salmon, herring, sand lance, and numerous invertebrates.

Eelgrass beds provide nutrients and shelter for various biota in Puget Sound. As eelgrass and other seagrasses decay, it combines with other dead matter. This rich detritus is a staple for invertebrates, which are fed upon by salmonids, birds and other predators. Eelgrass functions as a protective cover from the predators for juvenile salmon and as a nursery for herring that deposit eggs among bed. Herring, in turn, are an important food source for juvenile and adult salmon.

During low tide, eelgrass beds shelters other small animals from extreme temperatures, and in tideflats the beds act as a sponge for moisture.

Eelgrass monitoring is conducted throughout Puget Sound using random sampling under the Submerged Vegetation Monitoring Program, Washington Department of Natural Resources, Nearshore Program. Results for 2003–2004 were posted in 2005. Many eelgrass populations were holding steady, but sharp declines were noted in five shallow bays in the San Juan Islands and 14 smaller sites in the greater Puget Sound. Eelgrass throughout the entire Hood Canal showed a steady decline. In eleven embayments there was almost 83 acres (340,000 m^{2}) of eelgrass lost between 1995 and 2004.

A number of reasons contribute to the decline in eelgrass population, including, but not limited to:

1. Lack of appropriate substrate to grow upon
2. Lack of or poor-quality light, impacting photosynthesis
3. Changes in climate impacting currents, water temperature and water quality
4. Nutrient input, spurring algae growth, reducing light and oxygen availability
5. Sediment input, reducing light availability and quality
6. Physical alteration of the shoreline, potentially increasing wave energy or altering substrate in the nearshore area, sometimes both

The Puget Sound Conservation and Recovery Plan (2005–2007) outlines a number of goals for improving management and health of the state's eelgrass beds. These include increasing protection over eelgrass beds on state-managed aquatic lands, and developing a statewide "seagrass management conservation plan" to be used by local, state and federal agencies.

== Impacted species ==
=== Groundfish ===
60% of the ground fish populations are currently considered, by the areas scientific community, to be in acceptable or good conditions. The populations which are in decline are: middle-trophic level predators such as rockfish, spiny dogfish, Pacific cod, and hake.

=== Copper and quillback rockfish ===
There was a spawning decline for copper and quillback rockfish of close to 75% between 1970 and 1999; more recent data shows a continued decline. Many rockfish species which are popular to harvest in the area are showing large population decreases, while less popular species are showing signs of increased population.

=== Pacific herring ===
Puget Sound has 19 Pacific herring stocks; the populations from all have decreased since 2002. The largest decreases are found in the north Puget Sound area; where stocks dropped form roughly 12,000 tons of spawning biomass to 4,000 tons in 2004. The Cherry Point stock had particularly large decreases.

=== Harbor porpoise ===
The harbor porpoise was once very abundant in Puget Sound. However, its population declined to the point that it was rarely seen in the 1970s and 1980s. Its population has increased somewhat and it can now be seen in localized areas.

=== Orcas ===
Orcas in the south Puget Sound were added to the federal endangered species list in 2005. In 2007 their population numbered 86 (down from their peak population number of 98 in 1975).

=== Sea lions ===
The populations of sea lions in Washington State have increased. Steller sea lions specifically are showing an increase in population; 10% every year.

=== Harbor seal ===
The populations of harbor seals have been on the rise since the early 1970s. In 2007 there were approximately 14,000 harbor seals in the inland waters of Puget Sound alone.

=== Pinto abalone ===
Populations of the pinto abalone have sharply decreased due to the inability of the species to naturally reproduce. Between 1992 and 2005, in 10 long term monitoring stations, their populations declined from 351 animals per site, to 103 per site.

=== Olympia oyster ===
The population of Olympia oyster (Ostrea Lurida), been declining due to sewage contamination and the effects of sulfur liquor emissions (from pulp mills). Both of these things were shown to have serious effects on the reproductive part as well as the health part of Ostrea lurida. Some other problems include mining, logging, and boat traffic. Pollution like gasoline and motor oil from the boats is harmful to the species of oyster as well. The Journal of Shellfish Research states, "Although oysters may be able to tolerate brief exposure to motor oil and gasoline by closing their shell, up to 14% population mortality increases after 10 days [of exposure]". As the article states, another large problem for Olympia oysters is the human-caused sedimentation caused by topsoil runoff in areas of logging or mining. The sedimentation leads to murky waters and oysters that are buried under layers of runoff as well as non-secure places to inhabit.

=== Marine birds ===
There are over 100 species of marine bird which rely on Puget Sound as habitat. A survey completed by the Western Washington University (WWU) reports that the total number of marine birds in Puget Sound is decreasing. The cause of this decrease in population is not clear, although researchers suspect likely causes such as pollution, non-native species, and collisions with man made structures, abandoned or lost fishing gear, some fishing practices, unavailable food sources, and loss of habitat.

=== Scoters ===
There has been a decline of surf scoters, white-winged scoters, and black scoters. This decrease of scoters is the largest decrease in biomass of marine birds over the past 25 years in Puget Sound.

=== Loons and grebes ===
The loons and grebes which over-winter in Puget Sound have shown a population decrease of 75% in the past 10 years. (It is not known if this decline is due to a population decrease or a change in their winter location).

=== Salmon ===
Under provisions of the ESA, two salmon populations in the Pacific Northwest have been listed as endangered, but none within Puget Sound. One of the factors that contribute to declining salmon runs in Puget Sound, and the Pacific Northwest in general, is the lack of logjams in rivers. Logjams are essential to the survival of healthy salmon populations. Logjam and river current interaction carve deep pools into riverbeds, providing salmon and their young, also known as fry, with hiding places from predators. Logjams also force some of the water from the main river to spill out over the adjacent Floodplain, forming Tributaries along the river, which supply ideal habitat for maturing salmon. The natural processes of spawning and reaching maturity become much more difficult for salmon without the services logjams provide.

Also, as the organisms that salmon feed on begin to dwindle due to factors including overfishing and invasive species, salmon are further threatened as their food sources become precarious, as is the case with herring populations around Puget Sound (Puget Sound Action Team). For more information see Salmon conservation.

The increased urbanization around streams connected to Puget Sound has led to the annual increase in premature (adult salmon who have not yet spawned) spawner mortality rates. The exposure to metals and petroleum hydrocarbons which originate from motor powered vehicles in the urban area, have led to the recurring fish kills. Salmon that transition from saltwater to freshwater are vulnerable to the toxic substances found in the urban streams.

== Degradation of nearshore habitat ==
"Nearshore" is most commonly defined as the backshore, intertidal and shallow subtidal areas of shoreline. In Washington, for example, the Shoreline Management Act defines the upland edge of this area to be 200 feet (61 m) behind the shoreline. Many groups also consider the nearshore to go fairly deep beyond the intertidal zone.

More than 10,000 streams and rivers drain into Puget Sound. Approximately 1,800 miles (2,900 km) of shoreline surround the estuary, which is a mosaic of beaches, bluffs, deltas, mudflats and wetlands. A number of factors have been listed as potentially contributing to continued degradation of the nearshore environment. These include changing the nearshore by adding artificial structures, such as Tide gates and bulkheads increased pollution from various sources, such as failing septic systems; and various impacts from agricultural and industrial activities. One-third of more than 4,000 kilometres (2,500 mi) of Puget Sound shoreline has been modified by some form of human development, including Armoring, Dredging, filling and construction of overwater structures.

== Protected species ==
Federally Endangered:

- Sei whale
- Finback whale
- Gray wolf
- Marsh sandwort (plant)
- Taylor's Checkerspot
- Bocaccio Rockfish

Federally Threatened:

- Marbled murrelet
- Canada lynx
- Steller sea lion
- Chum salmon (Hood Canal)
- Chinook salmon
- Orcas (southern resident)
- Grizzly bear
- Bull trout
- Spotted owl
- Golden paintbrush (plant)
- Water howellia (plant)
- Kincaid's lupine (plant)
- Green sturgeon
- Bull Trout
- Steelhead
- Yelloweye Rockfish
- Oregon Spotted Frog
- Marbled Murrelet
- Wolverine

State Endangered That are Not Federally Endangered:

- Pinto Abalone
- Mardon Skipper
- Oregon Spotted Frog
- Northwestern Pond Turtle
- Marbled Murrelet
- Tufted Puffin
- Oregon Vesper Sparrow
- Cascade Red Fox
- Fisher

State Threatened Species:

- Sea Otter

State Sensitive Species:

- Olympic Mudminnow
- Common Loon

Species with Vulnerable Aggregations (these species are not officially protected but are monitored):

- Butter Clam
- Native Littleneck Clam
- Olympia Oyster
- Pacific Geoduck
- Dungeness Crab
- Pandalid Shrimp
- Pacific Clubtail
- Johnson's Hairstreak
- Puget Blue
- Sand-verbena Moth
- River Lamprey
- White Sturgeon
- Pacific Herring
- Longfin Smelt
- Surf Smelt
- Dolly Varden
- Pink Salmon
- Pacific Cod
- Pacific Hake
- Walleye Pollock
- Black Rockfish
- Brown Rockfish
- Canary Rockfish
- Copper Rockfish
- Greenstriped Rockfish
- Quillback Rockfish
- Redstripe Rockfish
- Tiger Rockfish
- Yellowtail Rockfish
- Lingcod
- Pacific Sand Lance
- Van Dyke’s Salamander
- Western Toad
- Western Grebe
- Great Blue Heron
- Harlequin Duck
- Trumpeter Swan
- Western High Arctic Brant
- Golden Eagle
- Northern Goshawk
- Yellow-billed Cuckoo
- Vaux’s Swift
- Keen’s Myotis
- Townsend’s Big-eared Bat
- California Sea Lion
- Dall's Porpoise
- Harbor Porpoise
- Harbor Seal
- Stellar Sea Lion

Unprotected species that are "critically imperiled":

- Pallid bat: Large, pale bat with doglike face. Feeds at night on large insects. Emits a skunk-like odor when disturbed
- American peregrine falcon: Removed from federal endangered list in 1999, but still endangered in Northwest. Cliffs were preferred nesting sites, but today many nest on high-rises.
- Sea cucumber: Relative of starfish and sea lilies; popular in Asian cuisine. Fourteen species found in Northwest waters.
- Marsh shrew: Insect-eating aquatic shrew with fringe of hairs on toes to aid swimming. Can run on top of the water for several seconds.

== Invasive species ==
Aquatic nuisance species are non-native plants or animals that threaten the diversity or abundance of native species; the Ecological stability of infested waters; or the commercial, agricultural or recreational activities that depend on such waters. In recent years, Puget Sound has seen an increase of invasive species, specifically from Japan, as early as 1971. Invasive species have come to Puget Sound via several factors, including aquaculture, importation of live seafood, shipping (attached to ship hulls and through ballast water), research and academic institutions, deliberate introductions, pet stores and public aquaria, and natural dispersal. The Japanese wire weed Sargassum muticum and the marine grass Spartina are currently two of the most damaging species. In response to such trends, ocean species have migrated to places they shouldn't. Puget Sound has the most introduced invasive species. Nationwide, about 400 of the 958 (42 percent) species listed as threatened or endangered under the ESA are considered to be at risk, primarily due to competition with and predation by non-native species.

The WDFW is now attempting to combat its exotic species problem with the Washington State Aquatic Nuisance Species Management Plan. Under this plan, Washington State Patrol Commercial Vehicle Inspectors search incoming vessels for harmful invasive species, such as the zebra mussel, and decontaminate the vessels before they can spread the organism.

The city of Olympia, Washington has worked with the United States Environmental Protection Agency to use the shells of invasive water snail which has started to decrease the numbers of the endemic Olympia Oyster. The invasive arched slipper limpet (Crepidula fornicata) shell is taken and, packed into the sidewalk. With doing so, the shells of the said invasive species of water snail will slow down the runoff and will reduce the flow of stormwater which will in turn reduce flooding and potential environmental damage. Walker says that "The scoop-shaped shell of the snail could help slow storm water. Currently the city uses rock and gravel beneath sidewalks to stabilize the concrete. City officials want to try using snail shells instead." The millions of snail shells could act as micro-reservoirs slowing the flow of stormwater and reducing the chances of city streams, brooks, and waterways. Emmett Dobey, the program manager at Olympia’s Department of Public Works says, "The process also seemed to reduce the amount of pollutants that typically come along for the ride".

== Oil spills ==
Since 1989, there have been 225 oil spills in Puget Sound. Nearly every day Puget Sound imports 550,000 barrels of unrefined oil, thus making Puget Sound one of the country's primary centers for refining petroleum. One such spill on October 14, 2004 in Dalco Passage leaked nearly 1,000 gallons over Vashon and Maury Islands.

== Solutions ==
The Washington state government has adapted the federal government's Marine Protected Area (MPA) system into designated Aquatic Reserves, defined as "aquatic lands of special educational or scientific interest or lands of special environmental importance that are threatened by degradation". Aquatic Reserves are meant to serve as aquatic versions of national parks or sanctuaries. Through the Aquatic Reserve Program, the DNR hopes to control these areas in an effort to restore, preserve or enhance habitats and species that directly tie into the aquatic ecosystem. The first Aquatic Reserve created under the program was at Maury Island in November 2004. Further candidate sites under review include Cherry Point, Fidalgo Bay and Cypress Island.

=== Legislation ===
Puget Sound Partnership reports that the Washington State Legislature included several priority items in the 2010 Supplemental Budget which are intended to support restorative efforts of the environment.

This includes funding totaling $50 million for Washington State Department of Ecology stormwater project funding. "Stormwater is a primary source of toxic chemicals and other hazardous materials washing into Puget Sound and other water bodies" . There is also $42 million allocated to projects targeting toxic site cleanup in Puget Sound.

The specifics of this legislature are as follows:

- $1.645 million for a wastewater treatment plant and reclamation project at Potlatch on Hood Canal. This money, through the Department of Ecology, will allow the project to be completed and will help restore the health of Hood Canal.
- $2.8 million for Carpenter Creek estuary restoration in Kitsap County through the Department of Fish and Wildlife to remove a culvert blocking fish passage and restore tidal function creating approximately 28 acres of estuary habitat.
- $1 million for the Puget Sound Near Shore Ecosystem Restoration Project (PSNERP) through the Department of Fish and Wildlife to complete scientific work and near shore restoration projects. Preliminary engineering and property assessments will be conducted for a portfolio of priority near shore restoration opportunities that would be eligible for federal funding through the US Army Corps of Engineers.
- $381,000 for the Nooksack Forks large woody debris placement for habitat enhancement through the Department of Fish and Wildlife. This project will construct six large woody structures along 1.5 miles of the Middle Fork Nooksack River and augment 20 stable large wood structures on five channel islands in the North Fork Nooksack River.
- $185,000 for the South Fork Nooksack River restoration through the Department of Fish and Wildlife. The project will remove a barrier to provide fish passage to 1.4 miles of river, placement of stable log jams, and 41 acres of riparian planting along 2,900 linear feet of stream and several adjoining wetlands.
- $3 million for Commencement Bay cleanup in Pierce County through the Department of Natural Resources. This project will remove 2,300 contaminated pilings to allow completion of in-water remediation of toxic contamination at the Asarco Superfund site.
- In addition, the Puget Sound Partnership played a key role in securing $15 million to help acquire the Maury Island gravel pit. This complicated transaction is still pending but the state resources will help lead to its successful culmination. The money comes from state accounts funded by polluters, not general tax revenue.

== Pollution advisories ==
Pollution advisories are posted for some of the beach areas on Puget Sound. These advisories warn the public of health concerns due to contact with sand and water of the posted areas. Showering after contact with material from these areas is advised. It is also advised to avoid eating fish and shell fish from these areas.

== See also ==
- Environmental issues on Maury Island
- Environmental issues in the United States
- Marine conservation
