= Environmental issues on Maury Island =

The environmental issues on Maury Island are linked to broader Puget Sound environmental issues, which include concerns regarding declining salmon and forage fish populations, degrading critical marine and shoreline habitats, and threatened species such as the Orca.

Many of these concerns are centered on the proposed expansion of a gravel site owned by Glacier Northwest.

== Gravel mining on Maury Island ==
The primary environmental issue on Maury Island is Glacier Northwest's proposal to expand its gravel mine, located in the southern part of the island. Glacier Northwest has operated the mine on the island since the 1940s. In 1998 it announced its proposal to expand the operation to approximately 7.5 million tons of gravel a year. In a presentation at the University of Washington in April 2005, Glacier Northwest senior executives claimed that the expansion of its South Maury Island mine is in the interest of the Pacific Northwest as a whole. They claimed Washington uses approximately 75 million tons of gravel and sand per year. The Seattle/Tacoma area uses 48% of all sand and gravel, making the South Maury Island site centrally located for supplying this demand. They estimated economic growth in the Puget Sound region between 2000-2020 would require an additional 22 million tons of gravel per year. They also claimed that Washington, and particularly the Seattle/Tacoma area, may benefit from an expansion of local sand and gravel mines. There is also potential for the construction of a third runway at the Seattle-Tacoma International Airport that would require large quantities of sand and gravel. Many people believe that South Maury Island is one of the most sensitive places to mine due to the amount of wildlife the area supports; however, Glacier Northwest claimed that mining on the island and barging the gravel off the site will have fewer environmental impacts than would mining somewhere else and transporting the gravel by truck. Grassroots efforts and litigation postponed the proposed expansion, and eventually led to an agreement in 2010 where a county park would replace the mine.

Glacier Northwest's proposed mining expansion has stirred response in the government. U.S. Senator Patty Murray, a senior member of the Appropriations Committee, has pushed measures for economic development and environmental and public safety initiatives throughout Washington, one of which concerns the conservation of Maury Island. Providing approximately $2 million, this bill would contribute to the goal of local organizations, such as POI, of preserving the threatened 250 acres (1 km²) that are home to the state's largest Madrona forests, as well as its shoreline habitats. By incorporating funds from local, state, and private sources, this bill would promote responsible, cost efficient local stewardship.

Among the key figures in the conflict is former Washington Governor Booth Gardner, also a member of Preserve Our Islands. In a presentation given at the University of Washington for the Society and Oceans Course on April 26, 2005, Gardner expressed his support for POI and his personal philosophy on understanding both sides of the South Maury Island/Glacier Northwest mining issue and acknowledging the importance of one's personal view and the opponent's stance.

Proponents in favor of Gravel mining by Glacier Northwest on Maury Island argued that mining the Maury Island site would provide a small number of jobs for people on the island and in surrounding areas, while operations were estimated to continue for the 20 to 30 years, depending on business and demand. Additionally, the aggregate resources do not produce much waste material when mined, and are therefore beneficial and cost effective for the region. The sand, gravel, and quarry rock from the Maury Island site would be distributed throughout the Pacific Northwest region to be used for building roadways and houses, creating concrete, and making other products such as roof tiles and cement blocks.

=== Arsenic contamination ===
Studies over the past 30 years have shown that the soil in some areas of Vashon-Maury Island has elevated concentrations of arsenic, lead, and cadmium, probably due to decades of copper smelting operations in Ruston, Washington, located just south of the southern tip of Vashon Island. When examined by area, the data indicates the most serious arsenic contamination is in South Vashon-Maury Island.

One risk associated with Glacier Northwest's plan for expansion involves amassing thousands of tons of arsenic-contaminated soil into a large, plastic container. Due to decades of downwind fallout from the ASARCO copper smelter near Tacoma, the top layer of earth on Maury Island is laden with toxins, including arsenic, which was found in concentrations nearly double those requiring industrial cleanup and 20 times those of residential standards. Glacier Northwest plans to bulldoze the top 18 inches of soil and store it in an enormous berm, which would store large amounts of hazardous wastes for 50–75 years.

=== Water supply ===
An issue that the residents of South Maury Island face as a result of the proposed expansions of the Glacier Northwest gravel mine is a possible threat to the residents' drinking water supply. The aquifer on South Maury Island relies on rainwater to sustain it. The rainwater is absorbed by the ground and is filtered through hundreds of feet of soil to a layer of permeable rock that holds the water. According to the EPA, the aquifer supplies 71% of the drinking water for island residents, making it the primary source of drinking water on the island, and making contamination of the aquifer system a significant hazard to public health. If the supply were to be contaminated, no reasonably available alternative source of drinking water could replace the aquifer system. According to POI, it is proposed that Glacier Northwest would mine to within 15 feet of the aquifer. This could lead to possible disruptions and contamination of the aquifer flow and recharge capabilities.

=== Creosote residue ===
One of the major issues currently under debate between Preserve Our Islands and Glacier Northwest is the construction of a new dock over the old one. The old dock, however, was constructed using creosote to preserve the wooden pilings. Creosote is a type of polycyclic aromatic hydrocarbon, which is detrimental to many types of marine life, and the removal of the old dock might leave some creosote residue behind. Herring eggs, which are often placed on pilings, die if the piling they are on is coated with creosote. It is cancerous to any marine life living near it, and the United States Environmental Protection Agency|EPA declared that any creosote spills over one gallon must be reported.

=== Salmon and the nearshore area ===
The well-being of the near-shore area around South Maury Island is another concern. Eelgrass (Zostera marina) is a habitat that protects developing anadromous fish, such as salmon, by providing cover from predation and food, which supports the growth of healthy salmon populations. Eelgrass beds also protect developing species such as herring, which are a food source for juvenile salmon. The construction of the new dock by Glacier Northwest will detrimentally affect eelgrass, disrupting species within the habitat. Docks and their construction affect eelgrass from underwater noise which would disturb fragile species, while creating shade that would threaten eelgrass growth.

=== Northwestern fence lizard ===
The northwestern fence lizard is a lesser known creature threatened by mining expansion. (Preserve Our Islands). The lizards themselves are far from endangered, even though South Maury Island is one of their only habitats in the Puget Sound area. However, removing these lizards from South Maury Island could be detrimental. The full effects of their absence on the island are unknown, but it is speculated that the insect populations that they feed on could rise without their natural predator, the effects of which could be anywhere from being a nuisance to destroying local flora. Also, Western Fence lizards are thought to diminish the danger of Lyme disease because when the ticks feed on the lizards, the Lyme disease bacteria is killed.

== Aquatic reserve ==
=== History ===
On November 21, 2000, Jennifer Belcher, the Washington State Lands Commissioner and a Democrat, declared five controversial areas around the Puget Sound as aquatic reserves. One month later in December 2000, Belcher added Maury Island to the list of aquatic reserves. Many saw this as an attempt to make more obstacles for Glacier Northwest in its goal of obtaining a new dock permit. Subsequently, Glacier Northwest filed a lawsuit against Jennifer Belcher protesting her unilateral decision to establish the aquatic reserves (Gordon 2001). Despite the litigation, the Maury Island Aquatic Reserve was reaffirmed by Belcher's successor Doug Sutherland, a Republican, along with a more specific purpose and protection for the submerged lands in question (Gordon 2004).

=== Goals of the aquatic reserve ===
The reserve was designed to “conserve, preserve, restore, and/or enhance” the habitats and species that make up Maury Island (Draft Management Plan 14). Of the four main goals, the first goal is to conserve the native habitats of plants and wildlife species including forage fish, salmonids, and migratory birds. The second goal is to conserve the functions and native processes of the near-shore ecosystem. The third is to maintain the territory, habitats and species through education and providing opportunities for public involvement. The fourth goal is promote responsible management of recreational, commercial and cultural uses of Maury Island that relate to the previous goals. According to the management plan, a reviewed and updated version will be made every ten years for ninety years.

=== Threatened bird populations ===
Quartermaster Harbor, which lies between Maury Island and Vashon Island, has been declared by the Audubon Society as an “Important Bird Area” due to its rare intact ecosystem and eelgrass bed habitat (Audubon Society Washington Watchlist Webpage). The beds support herring, which are an important food source for many of the bird species that breed in Quartermaster Harbor (Audubon Society Washington Watchlist Webpage). Several of the species that use the area are either federally listed as being threatened or are strong candidates for state recognition as threatened species. Included on this list are the marbled murrelet, common loon, and Brandt's cormorant (Audubon Society Washingtoto address lifelong maintenance tagsn Watchlist Webpage). In addition, Quartermaster Harbor plays a large role in grebe ecology, with 8-10% of Washington’s total grebe population using it as winter habitat (Holt, A1). Western grebe populations have declined by about 95% since the 1970s, from 120,000 birds to less than 5,000 in the year 2000, making Quartermaster Harbor an important refuge for remaining birds (Holt, A1). Marbled murrelets are also on the decline, having lost nearly 96% of their population to oil spills, loss of habitat, and gill nets (Holt, A1; Audubon Society Marbled Murrelet Webpage).

These integral bird populations that are being threatened helped to prompt the Washington Department of Natural Resources to select Quartermaster Harbor and the southeastern shore of Maury Island as an aquatic reserve in 2003. One of four sites selected in the state of Washington, this particular area is not only rich in species of birds, but also includes many other diverse habitats such as extensive eelgrass beds, kelp beds, herring spawning grounds, Chinook salmon migratory corridors, and bottom fish rearing habitats. The proposed shoreline has been surveyed by the department and was found to have 78% of its expanse covered in eelgrass beds, which provide food for marine species as well as anchoring sediments and keep sub tidal environments moist (Maury Island Aquatic Reserve Supplemental Environmental Impact Statement). It was felt that the creation of the reserve would positively impact the aquatic vegetation through the implementation of good management policies, as well as setting standards for operations and construction in regard to marinas, over-water structures, recreational docks, and mooring buoys. An aquatic reserve would help create a healthy ecosystem that connects all of these habitats, which would create economic advantages and opportunities to enjoy these aquatic ecosystems for generations to come (Washington State Department of National Resources Webpage).

The Department of National Resources would partner with King County and the Department of Ecology to help the species in the marine habitat by improving water quality and minimizing soil erosion and shoreline hardening. These improvements would be countered by the actions of Glacier Northwest, which could contribute to the depletion of water quality as well as the destruction of bluffs and shorelines across the site.

=== Southern resident orca whale community ===
The aquatic reserve on Maury Island functions as a herring nursery and is in the migratory corridor of the endangered Chinook salmon. These fish, dependent on the eelgrass (Zostera marina) beds, are vital to the J, K and L Orca whale pods that occupy southern Puget Sound waters between the months of October and March. Salmon account for 90% of the orca whales’ diet, 2/3 of that consisting of the Chinook salmon. These three pods, currently consisting of 84 individual whales, utilize this area for a winter feeding ground as well as for calving and nursing their young (Preserve Our Islands Web site. Maury Island strip mine could cause killer whales to quit south sound). The Southern Resident orca (Orcinus orca) is listed by the Washington State Department of Fish and Wildlife Commission as an endangered species, and is listed as depleted under the Federal Marine Mammal Protection Act (Washington Dept. of Fish and Wildlife).

According to University of Washington research scientist David Bain, this orca population is "teetering on the brink of extinction" (Ervin 2004). Bain suggested that the Glacier Northwest's proposed dock expansion, along with the frequent tug and barge traffic used to load and transport the gravel, could deter the orcas from utilizing this area. The noise created by loading the gravel onto the barges would be magnified by the water and, at full proposed operation, would be fairly constant. Bain, who is studying the effects of noise on the orcas for the National Marine Fisheries Service, suggests that being deterred from using this area could contribute to the extinction of this resident population.

== Oil spills ==
Another pressing environmental concern South Maury Island faces is oil spills. Although they are not directly related to the Glacier Northwest mining controversy, oil spills add to the sensitivity of the area as an aquatic reserve. On October 14, 2004, an oil spill occurred in the Dalco Passage at around 1 AM. An estimated 1,000 gallons spilled into the waterways surrounding Vashon/Maury Island. The source of the oil was initially unknown, but tests carried out by the Coast Guard and Washington Department of Ecology determined that the source was the Polar Texas oil tanker owned by ConocoPhillips. (Washington State Department of Ecology Web Page: Dalco Passage Spill)

Though recent spills have been minor, there is concern that Washington does not have the capacity to respond to a big oil spill in the future, which would devastate the environment and have significant impacts on the surrounding community, wildlife, and fisheries. Efforts are being made to strengthen the community, State, and Coast Guard partnership in preventing and responding to oil spills effectively. Washington is also working to improve Tug Escorts for loaded tankers, enhance oil spill contingency plans, and remedy environmental damage already caused by oil spills. (Washington State Department of Ecology Web Page: Spill Prevention, Preparedness, and Response)

One of the more recent oil spills occurred on January 28, 2005. Ecology officials estimated that “hundreds of gallons” contaminated the Dalco Passage off Vashon/Maury Island. The cause of the spill is still unknown, even after the Coast Guard and Department of Ecology collected oil samples in an effort to identify the source (People for Puget Sound article on Jan. 2005 oil spill).

In dealing with significant oil spills, the Washington State Department of Ecology works with other organizations to assess the damage done in monetary value, and, if possible, seeks compensation from the responsible party(s). The State Department of Ecology then works with other organizations, using the money to mitigate the oil spill, to restore and protect priority wildlife habitats (Washington State Spill Prevention/Response page).

Vashon- Maury Island Community Council

Vashon-Maury Island faces many environmental issues, but the Vashon-Maury Island Community Council has been serving this island since 1933. This council is a town hall style forum for the discussion of issues relevant to the residents of the Vashon-Maury Islands. The Council is recognized by King County as an Unincorporated Area Community Council. As a town hall forum, decisions are made by a public vote at their general meetings. Much of the work of the Council takes place in its committees, which then forward their recommendations to the whole Council for action. Public meetings are held once a month and welcome all residents of the island over the age of 18 to discuss the upcoming events and issues surrounding this island. The council lets all residents know the issues the island is facing and allows people to take action.

== Glacier Northwest's EIS ==
In order to mine for gravel, Glacier Northwest is required to provide an Environmental Impact Statement (EIS) detailing the proposed scale of operation, which is then reviewed by King County. Sand and gravel extraction could be as high as 7.5 million tons per year, but could also be much lower, depending on demand. Also dependent on demand is the lifetime of the mine, which could be 11 years at full production, up to 35 years before the site is closed. The clearing of ground is proposed to occur in phases of 32 acres (129,000 m²) each, with no more than two phases in process at a time. In order to reduce arsenic contamination, contaminated materials will be contained within a sealed berm, and no contaminated materials will leave the site.

Also stated in the EIS are alternative actions that Glacier Northwest proposes to take in order for them to mine at the Maury Island site, including reduced hours of barging to control noise, mitigation of the Madrone forest, habitat retention for the pileated woodpecker by creating a habitat elsewhere prior to removing the Douglas-fir snags, and the alternative of not only repairing the dock that already exists, but replacing it altogether. This new dock is proposed to be built with the latest technology to reduce shade and contamination, and to extend into deeper water to avoid impacts to the most sensitive areas of the shoreline. Building a new dock would eliminate repeated repairs on the existing dock.

== Possible advantages and disadvantages of the Glacier Northwest Gravel Pit ==
There are some possible advantages to the mining on South Maury Island, as well as disadvantages. According to Glacier Northwest, Maury island has one of the largest reserves of gravel rock, and, because it is an island, the gravel can be easily transported on barges to other areas of the Pacific Northwest. However, the barge traffic itself could increase pollution levels, and also increase the chances of possible collisions with endangered marine mammals who reside in or pass through the area. One of the arguments against the transportation of the rock is that the new dock that would be built for it has much potential for the destruction of vital habitat for sea life. The impact could be lessened if Glacier Northwest replaces or mitigates any damages caused by the dock. Another worry of the Preserve Our Lands and other groups is the possible arsenic contamination of the drinking water. This could be offset by large containers that could contain the waste from the mining. However, what would happen to the arsenic after has been contained has yet to be addressed in detail. Other benefits of the mining are the large number of jobs the mine could create, and the boost to the local economy that the mine might produce. However, the mine could also negatively affect tourism and property values in the area.
