= Vashon Navigation Company =

Defunct 20th century shipping company

- Founded: 1905
- Headquarters: Dockton, Washington

The Vashon Navigation Company was a shipping company that operated steamboats on Puget Sound in the early 1900s. Steamboats owned by the company included Norwood and the propeller steamer Vashon. The company was founded by steamboat captain Chauncey "Chance" Wiman (whose wife Gertrude also held a steamboat master's license) and John Manson, of Dockton, who was a steamboat captain and an engineer.

== See also ==
- Newell, Gordon, Ships of the Inland Sea, Binford and Mort, Portland, OR (2nd Ed. 1960)
- Newell, Gordon, and Williamson, Joe, Pacific Steamboats, Bonanza Books, New York, NY (1963)
