= Preserve Our Islands =

- Abbreviation: POI
- Location: Maury Island, Washington, United States
- Website: www.preserveourislands.org

Preserve Our Islands (previously known as Protect Our Islands) is a grassroots organization, created by Senator Sharon Nelson and residents of Maury Island, Washington, United States, that is opposed to Glacier Northwest and their efforts to mine aggregate on Maury Island.

== The Founding ==
The Northwest Aggregates Company, also known as Glacier Northwest or Glaciers, had announced that they wanted to expand their surface gravel mine in Maury Island. Specifically, in May 1998, the mining company intended to fill Seattle–Tacoma International Airport's third runway; therefore, they sought for a shoreline exemption in order to fix their broken pier and loading facility located on a land owned by the State of Washington. Moreover, they requested a permit that would allow them to mine 7.5 million tons (6.804 billion kg) of gravel per year. Upon learning the extent of Glacier's expansion and driven by the need to protect the island's habitats and wildlife, Sharon Nelson and other homeowners and islanders formed Protect Our Islands (POI) (later named Preserve Our Islands) in opposition of the mine expansion.

== Preserve Our Islands vs. Glacier Northwest ==
POI had convinced the Washington State Department of Ecology to send biologists to study Glacier's proposed mining area, which was located above Maury Island's main water supply. They found high levels of arsenic and lead in the soil, elements that could contaminate the island's aquifer, a permeable, underground layer of water-bed rock that acts as a reservoir for groundwater. This contamination can lead to development disabilities in humans who drink the water. Despite Glacier's proposal of building a 30-feet (9.14 m) high, 150-feet (45.7 m) wide, and 2,100-feet (640 m) long sealed berm that would isolate the soil and prevent any contamination, POI and other opponents were still not reassured of the safety of the island's water supply.

Initially, POI and other opponents of the mine were on the losing end as the Court of Appeals ruled in favor of Glacier, the United States Army Corps of Engineers (U.S.A.C.E.) approved Glacier's permit, and the Washington State Supreme Court denied to hear POI's case against Glacier. Eventually, things were looking up for the opposition. First, Doug Sutherland, a supporter of the mine expansion, lost the position of Commissioner of Public Lands to Peter J. Goldmark, an opponent of the mine expansion. Second, a statewide effort to restore Puget Sound was initiated by Governor Chris Gregoire. Third, with the support of the Backbone Campaign, POI organized a protest at the Glacier mine area with more than 500 protesters; this garnered media attention and gave this issue greater visibility. Fourth, in 2009, US District Judge Ricardo Martinez declared that construction on the loading facility can no longer continue until the U.S.A.C.E. thoroughly assesses the environmental implications of Glacier's project.

In the end, Glacier Northwest ended the mine expansion and the site was turned into the 235-acre (95.1 ha) King County Marine Park, after it was purchased by King County on January 8, 2011.
