= Glacier Northwest, Inc. v. Teamsters =

- Supreme Court of the United States

Argued January 10, 2023 Decided June 1, 2023
- Full case name: Glacier Northwest, Inc., dba CalPortland v. International Brotherhood of Teamsters Local Union No. 174
- Docket no.: 21-1449
- Citations: 598 U.S. 771 (more)
- Argument: Oral argument
- Opinion announcement: Opinion announcement

Case history
- Prior: Judgment for defendants, (Washington Supreme Court, Dec. 16, 2021);

Holding
- The National Labor Relations Act did not preempt Glacier’s state tort claims related to the destruction of company property during a labor dispute where the union failed to take reasonable precautions to avoid foreseeable and imminent danger to the property.

Court membership
- Chief Justice John Roberts Associate Justices Clarence Thomas · Samuel Alito; Sonia Sotomayor · Elena Kagan; Neil Gorsuch · Brett Kavanaugh; Amy Coney Barrett · Ketanji Brown Jackson

Case opinions
- Majority: Barrett, joined by Roberts, Sotomayor, Kagan, Kavanaugh
- Concurrence: Thomas (in judgment), joined by Gorsuch
- Concurrence: Alito (in judgment), joined by Thomas, Gorsuch
- Dissent: Jackson

Laws applied
- National Labor Relations Act

Glacier Northwest, Inc. v. International Brotherhood of Teamsters Local Union No. 174, 598 U.S. 771 (2023) was a decision of the Supreme Court of the United States related to federal labor law, concerning the power of employers to sue labor unions regarding destruction of employer property following a strike. In an 8–1 decision, the Court acknowledged that the right to strike is not absolute, and concluded that the National Labor Relations Act did not preempt lawsuits filed against the union, thus allowing litigation to continue.

== Background ==
Glacier Northwest delivers concrete to customers in the State of Washington using ready-mix trucks with rotating drums that prevent the concrete from hardening during transit. Concrete is highly perishable, and even concrete in a rotating drum will eventually harden, causing significant damage to the vehicle. Glacier's truck drivers are members of the International Brotherhood of Teamsters Local Union No. 174. After a collective-bargaining agreement between Glacier and the Union expired, the Union called for a work stoppage on a morning it knew the company was in the midst of mixing substantial amounts of concrete, loading batches into ready-mix trucks, and making deliveries. The Union directed drivers to ignore Glacier's instructions to finish deliveries in progress. At least 16 drivers who had already set out for deliveries returned with fully loaded trucks. By initiating emergency maneuvers to offload the concrete, Glacier prevented significant damage to its trucks, but all the concrete mixed that day hardened and became useless.

Glacier sued the Union for damages in state court, claiming that the Union intentionally destroyed the company's concrete and that this conduct amounted to common-law conversion and trespass to chattels. The Union moved to dismiss Glacier's tort claims on the ground that the National Labor Relations Act preempted them. While a federal law generally preempts state law when the two conflict, the NLRA preempts state law even when the two only arguably conflict. In the Union's view, the NLRA—which protects employees’ rights “to selforganization, to form, join, or assist labor organizations,...and to engage in other concerted activities for the purpose of collective bargaining or other mutual aid or protection”—at least arguably protected the drivers’ conduct, so the State lacked the power to hold the Union accountable for any of the strike's consequences. The Washington Supreme Court agreed with the Union, reasoning that “the NLRA preempts Glacier’s tort claims related to the loss of its concrete product because that loss was incidental to a strike arguably protected by federal law.”

== Supreme Court ==
=== Amicus briefs ===
A number of organizations filed amicus briefs, or "friend of the court" filings, in the case when it came before the Supreme Court. Among the organizations that filed amicus briefs in support of the plaintiff, Glacier, were the National Right to Work Legal Defense Foundation, the Landmark Legal Foundation, the United States Chamber of Commerce, and the Buckeye Institute. Amicus briefs in support of the defendant, by contrast, included UNITE HERE International, SMART International, the United Brotherhood of Carpenters and Joiners of America, and the AFL-CIO.

=== Opinion of the Court ===
On June 1, 2023, the Supreme Court reversed and remanded the judgment of the Washington Supreme Court in an 8–1 vote, finding that the NLRA does not preempt claims for intentional destruction of property. Justice Amy Coney Barrett wrote the controlling majority opinion, joined by Chief Justice Roberts and Justices Sotomayor, Kagan, and Kavanaugh. The majority found that the union's "actions not only resulted in the destruction of all the concrete Glacier had prepared that day; they also posed a risk of foreseeable, aggravated, and imminent harm to Glacier’s trucks. Because the Union took affirmative steps to endanger Glacier’s property rather than reasonable precautions to mitigate that risk, the NLRA does not arguably protect its conduct," the decision said.

Justice Samuel Alito, joined by Justices Thomas and Gorsuch, concurred in the judgment. Justice Thomas, joined by Justice Gorsuch, also filed an opinion concurring in the judgment. These justices agreed with the majority that the conduct of the union was not protected—but would have resolved the case on broader grounds.

Justice Ketanji Brown Jackson filed the sole dissenting opinion. Jackson argued that the Court "fails, in multiple respects, to heed Congress’s intent with respect to the Board's primary role in adjudicating labor disputes." Jackson also added that the decision will likely create confusion for the lower courts and "risk the erosion of the right to strike."

== Reactions and analysis ==
There were mixed reactions to the decision. The attorney for the International Brotherhood of Teamsters Local Union No. 174, Darin Dalmat, said he was "relieved" that the decision did not explicitly overturn precedents and pleased the court "reaffirmed that strikers don’t have to give notice of the timing of a strike, outside of the healthcare industry." University of Minnesota Law School Professor Charlotte Garden, who specializes in labor law, stated that the ruling isn't "as bad as it could have been" for organized labor but said it left open the possibility that unions will be "on the hook for product loss" attributable to employer actions following a strike. CNN analyst and University of Texas School of Law professor Steve Vladeck stated that the decision will create uncertainty for "when striking workers can and can’t be sued for damage to their employers" but stated that since Amy Coney Barrett’s analysis "rests on the narrow facts of this case" it was enough to bring in "two of the three Democratic appointees, and too narrow for some of her fellow conservatives." AFL-CIO President Liz Shuler said the ruling had relied on "unfounded allegations" by Glacier Northwest, and said that when the facts are shown during the remanded case, it will be clear that the union acted correctly, that the strike is "protected by federal law," and said that the decision would "in no way deter workers from going on strike." Jane McAlevey of The Nation said that the ruling was a "blow to workers" but not a "knockout punch" that the United States Chamber of Commerce, as it leaves "the Garmon preemption" intact, but states that Justices Thomas, Alito, and Gorsuch are ready to "totally eviscerate the NLRB."

Some groups praised the decision. The lawyer for the Glacier Northwest, Noel Francisco, argued that the ruling vindicated the principle that federal law doesn't shield labor unions "from tort liability when they intentionally destroy an employer’s property" and said the company is entitled to "just compensation for...property that the union intentionally destroyed." The National Right to Work Legal Defense Foundation, which supported Glacier Northwest, praised the decision, stating that the court had ruled correctly, stating that union officials should not have "immunity from state lawsuits over deliberate property damage perpetrated during union strike actions". Walter Olson of CATO Institute stated that the court's decision "showed a good measure of consensus and civility."

Others were more critical. General president of the International Brotherhood of Teamsters, Sean O'Brien derided the justices as "political hacks" and argued that the Supreme Court had "again voted in favor of corporations over working people" by disregarding previous precedent in a press release. He added that the ruling would give companies "more power to hobble workers" if there are attempts to fight against "a growing system of corruption." Jules Roscoe wrote in Vice.com that the decision sets a new precedent for "how companies can respond to striking workers, as large-scale strikes become more common in the U.S." Erwin Chemerinsky and Catherine Fisk, both at the UC Berkeley School of Law, argued that the ruling eroded the right to strike and said "workers will pay the price" for the ruling. Sharon Block, a Harvard University professor, said the decision is like "putting a tax on the right to strike" and will chill labor activism.

The Guardian described the decision as a "setback to labor unions". UPI stated that the ruling asserted that companies can sue workers if "they believe their activism leads to damages." Vox called it a "significant blow to workers’ right to strike" and said it will make it easier for "well-moneyed employers to grind down unions with legal fees." Prior to the decision, Stanford Law professor William Gould, predicted that the court would narrow the jurisdiction of the NLRB and "expose unions to damages for engaging in strikes," which he described as "really unprecedented." Association of Flight Attendants-CWA president Sarah Nelson stated that the decision will "create even more instability in the workplace" and stated the court has to respect the right to strike or "workers will take it into their own hands." Jane McAlevey wrote that the case was "messy" and argued that in a "cleaner case" the court would "dismantle the legal right to strike" and that the UPS-Teamsters deal in 2023 is "Glacier-proof."
