= Maury Island =

Island in Puget Sound, Washington

Coordinates: 47°22′37″N 122°25′47″W

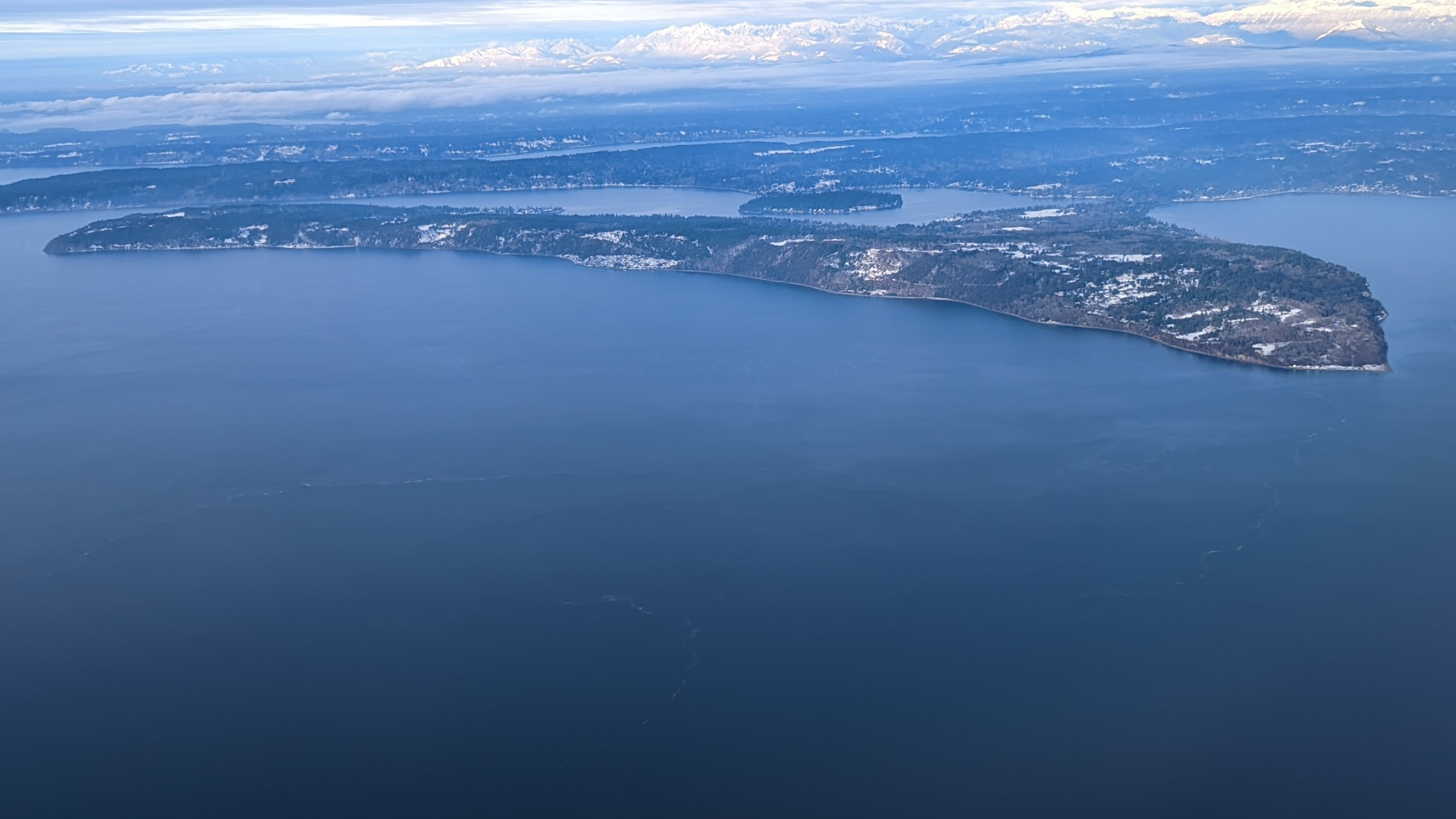
Full view of Maury Island, looking towards the west

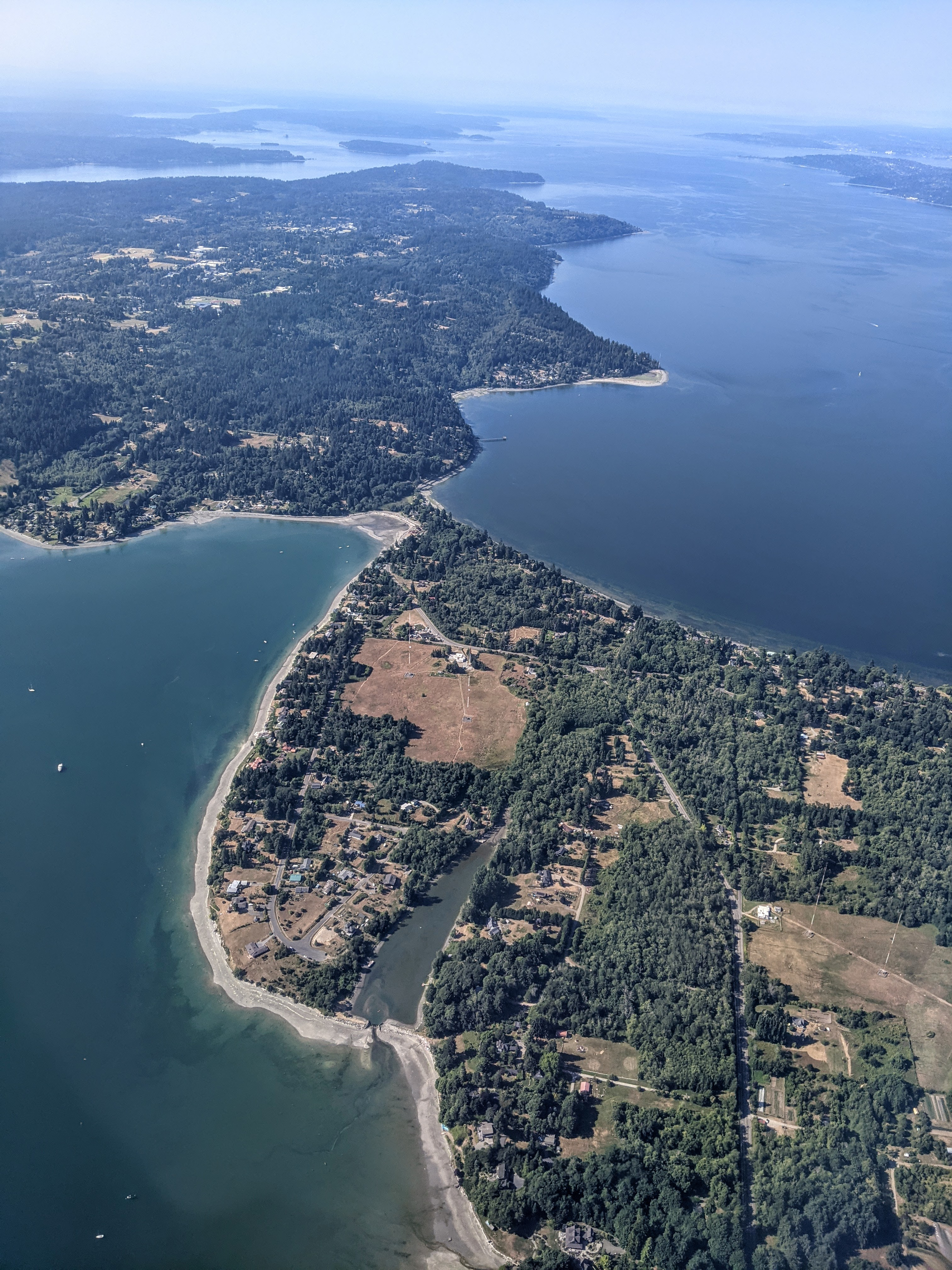
Aerial with Maury Island (foreground) showing the isthmus to Vashon Island

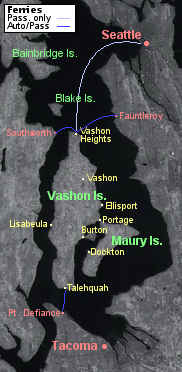
Map of Vashon–Maury Island and vicinity

Maury Island is a tied island in Puget Sound in the U.S. state of Washington. It is connected to Vashon Island by an isthmus built by local homeowners in 1913. Before construction of the isthmus, the island was connected to Vashon only during low tide. The island is rural with large areas of farmland, forest, and relatively undeveloped shoreline. Currently, environmental issues on the island are under considerable scrutiny.

Maury Island was named in 1841 during the Wilkes Expedition in honor of William Lewis Maury. It was the site of the Maury Island incident, a case of an alleged encounter with a UFO.

Point Robinson Light is located on Point Robinson, the easternmost point on Maury Island. Dockton was once the site of a dry dock as well as a salmon cannery.

Maury and Vashon Islands are home to the Vashon-Maury Island Community Council. In the 1940s, Vashon had a chamber of commerce that acted more like a community council than a traditional chamber. By the 1950s, the precursor to today's community council was organized and called itself the "Civic Assembly." Today, the Community Council is charged with working to preserve the rural nature of Vashon and Maury Islands.

Maury Island was also the center of controversy between the locals and Glacier Northwest, a company that supplies ready-mixed concrete owned by the Taiheiyo Cement Company of Japan. The company intended a 300-fold expansion of their existing gravel mine on the island, which was previously permitted to extract up to 20,000 tons per year. With the expansion, the company would have gained the capability to extract up to 40,000 tons per day. The opposition group made up of local islanders was known as Preserve Our Islands and staunchly advocated gathering more information before continuing mining operations on the island. The affected shoreline is located within the state's only existing aquatic preserve for notably diverse marine ecosystems. Opponents of the mine disputed many of the claims made by Glacier Northwest and alleged that the project will severely impact sensitive shoreline habitat. On December 30, 2010, King County bought the property and took possession of the land, including the keys to the property gate. The council adopted King County Executive Dow Constantine's proposed purchase and sale of the property on December 6, including the adoption of his financing package. The King County Department of Natural Resources and Parks will now work with the community to improve the property for public open space, while restoring the ecological habitat for wildlife. The mile of shoreline that is part of the purchase is the longest undeveloped stretch of shore in King County, and will be a critical part of the region's wildlife habitat for fish, birds and Puget Sound marine life.
