= Everett massacre =

1916 gunfight in Everett, Washington, US

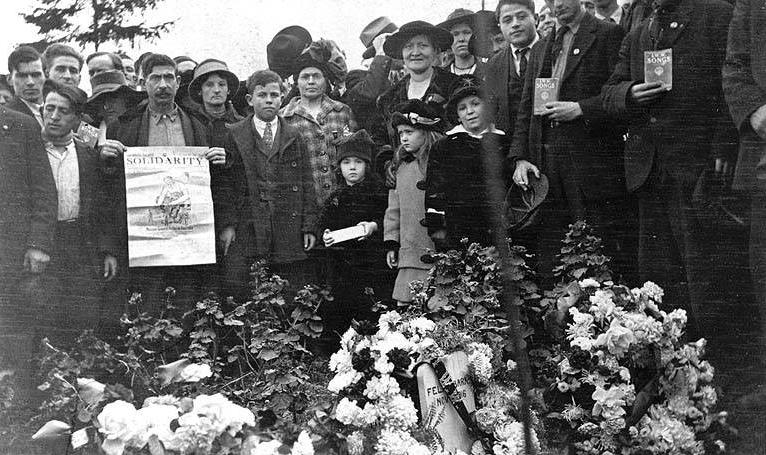
- Funeral of an IWW member
- Date: November 5, 1916
- Location: Everett, Washington, US; 47°58′46″N 122°13′13″W
- Goals: Labor rights Wage increase
- Methods: Strikes, protests, demonstrations

Parties
Shingle weavers; Industrial Workers of the World	Everett police; vigilantes

Lead figures
Thomas H. Tracy	Donald McRae

Casualties and losses
Deaths: 5+ Injuries: 27; Arrests: 75	Deaths: 2 Injuries: 20

The Everett massacre, also known as Bloody Sunday, was an armed confrontation between local authorities and members of the Industrial Workers of the World (IWW) union, commonly called "Wobblies", in Everett, Washington, United States on November 5, 1916. The event happened amidst a time of rising tensions in Pacific Northwest labor history.

== Background ==
In 1916, Everett was a port city of about 35,000 residents on Puget Sound. Amidst an economic downturn, confrontations were occurring between business, commercial interests, labor, and labor organizers. There had been a number of labor-organized rallies and speeches in the street. These were opposed by local law enforcement, which was firmly on the side of business. On October 30, 1916, 41 IWW organizers traveled to Everett by ferryboat to support a months-long strike initiated by shingle weavers on May 1. Once the Wobblies arrived, vigilantes organized by business had beaten them up with axe handles and run them out of town. The Seattle IWW decided to return to Everett in larger numbers to hold a rally in support of the striking shingle weavers.

== Confrontation at the dock ==
On Sunday, November 5, 1916, about 300 IWW members met at the IWW Hall in Seattle and then marched down to the docks where they boarded the steamers Verona and Calista which then headed north to Everett. Verona arrived at Everett before Calista and as they approached the dock in the early afternoon, the Wobblies sang their fight song "Hold the Fort". Local business interests, knowing the Wobblies were coming, placed armed criminal groups on the dock and on at least one tugboat in the harbor, the Edison, owned by the American Tug Boat Company. As with previous labor demonstrations, the local businessmen had also secured the aid of law enforcement, including the Snohomish County sheriff Donald McRae, who was known for targeting Wobblies for arbitrary arrests and beatings.

== Shootout ==
More than 200 vigilantes or "citizen deputies", under the ostensible authority of Snohomish County Sheriff McRae, met in order to repel the "anarchists". As the Verona drew into the dock and someone on board threw a line over a bollard, McRae stepped forward and called out, "Boys, who's your leader?" The IWW men laughed and jeered, replying "We're all leaders," and they started to swing out the gang plank. McRae drew his pistol, told them he was the sheriff, he was enforcing the law, and they couldn't land here. There was a silence, then a Wobbly came up to the front and yelled out "the hell we can't."

Just then a single shot rang out, followed by about ten minutes of intense gunfire. Most of it came from the vigilantes on the dock, but some fire came from the Verona, although the majority of the passengers were unarmed. Whether the first shot came from boat or dock was never determined. Passengers aboard the Verona rushed to the opposite side of the ship, nearly capsizing the vessel. The ship's rail broke and a number of passengers were ejected into the water, some drowned as a result, but how many is not known or whether persons who'd been shot also went overboard. Over 175 bullets pierced the pilot house alone, and the captain of the Verona, Chance Wiman, was only able to avoid being shot by ducking behind the ship's safe.

Once the ship righted herself somewhat after the near-capsize, some slack came on the bowline, and Engineer Shellgren put the engines hard astern, parting the line, and enabling the steamer to escape. Out in the harbor, Captain Wiman warned off the approaching Calista and then raced back to Seattle.

== Death toll ==
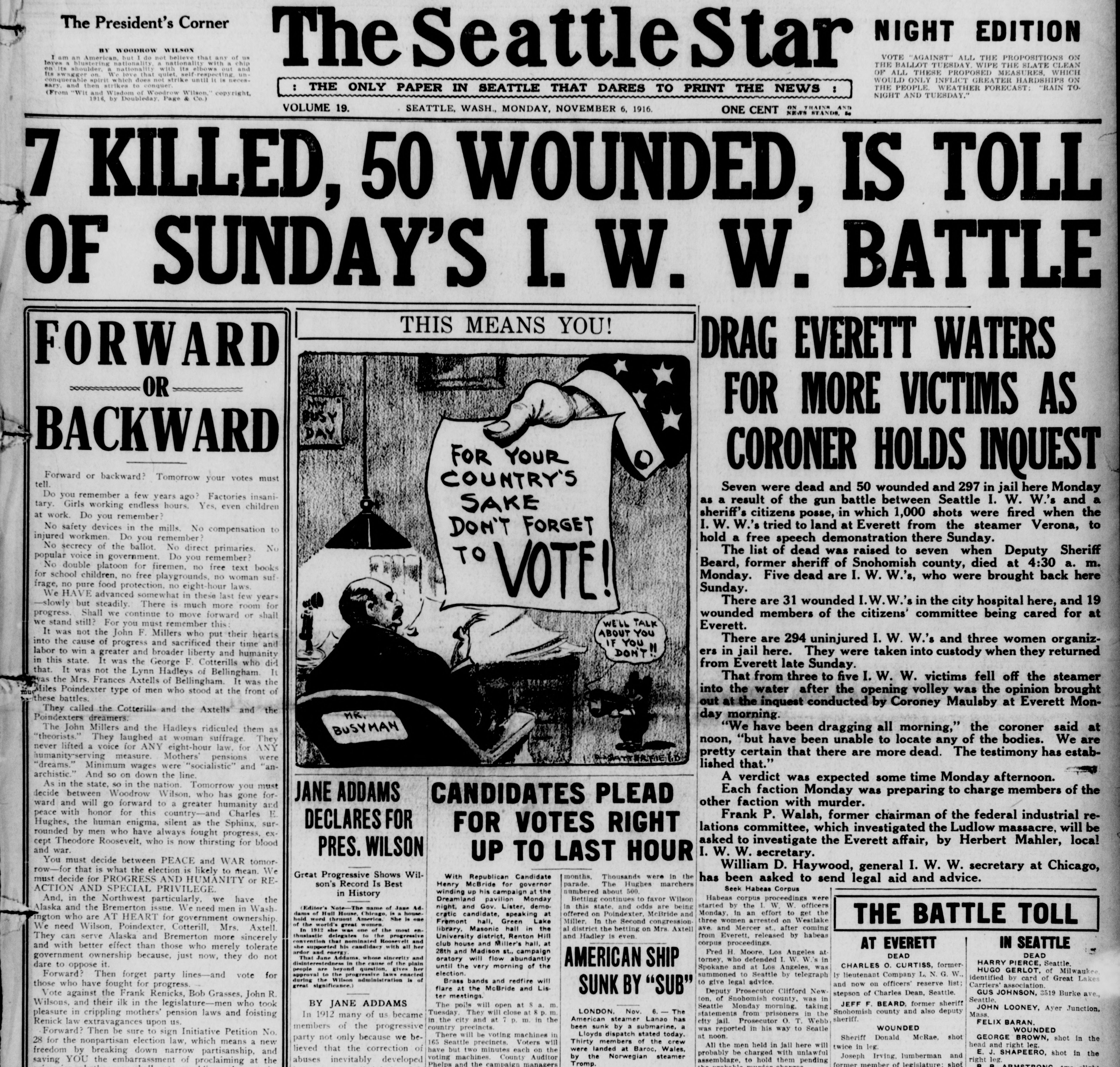
The Seattle Star, November 6, 1916, Front Page

At the end of the mayhem, two deputized citizens lay dead, with 16 or 20 others wounded, including Sheriff McRae. The two citizen deputies that were killed were actually shot in the back by fellow deputies; their wounds were not caused by Wobbly gunfire. The IWW officially listed 5 dead and 27 wounded, although it is speculated that as many as 12 IWW members may have been killed. There was a good likelihood that at least some of the casualties on the dock were caused not by IWW firing from the steamer, but by vigilante rounds from the cross-fire of bullets coming from the Edison. The local Everett Wobblies started their street rally anyway. In response, McRae's deputized citizens rounded them up and hauled them off to jail. As a result of the shootings, Governor Ernest Lister of the State of Washington sent companies of militia to Everett and Seattle to help maintain order.

== Question of violence ==
There have been many efforts to find the IWW, a self-described radical union, at fault for the violence. Other historians have placed blame on external forces, including that a private detective working as a labor spy had advocated violent action at an IWW meeting in Everett.

== Aftermath ==
Upon returning to Seattle, 74 Wobblies were arrested as a direct result of the "Everett Massacre" including IWW leader Thomas H. Tracy. They were taken to the Snohomish County jail in Everett and charged with murder of the two deputies. After a two-month trial, Tracy was acquitted by a jury on May 5, 1917. Shortly thereafter, all charges were dropped against the remaining 73 defendants and they were released from jail.

== See also ==
- List of massacres in the United States
- Industrial Workers of the World
- List of incidents of civil unrest in the United States
- List of worker deaths in United States labor disputes
