= Shingle weaver =

Person involved in making roofing shingles

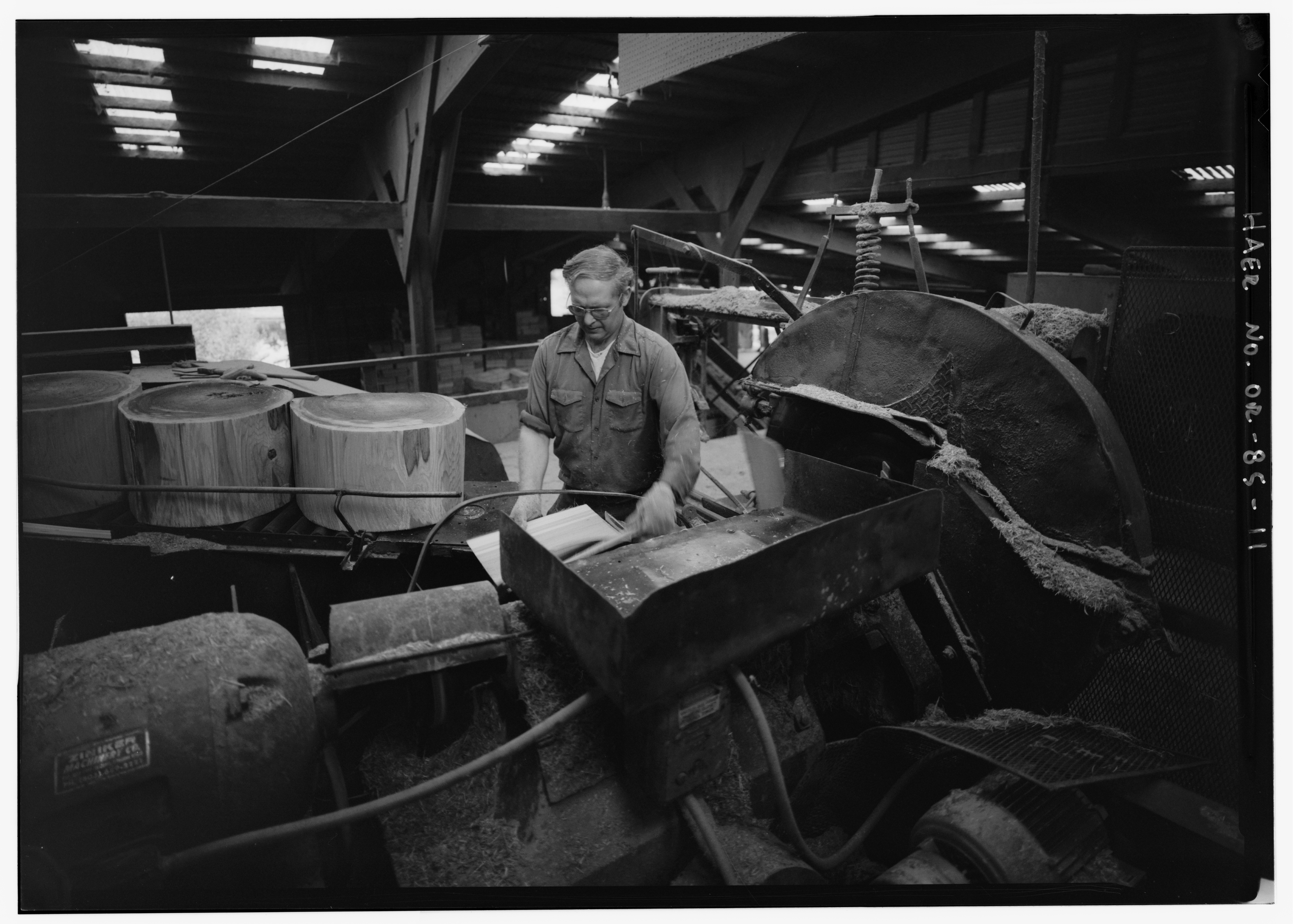
View of shingle weaver Floyd W. Williams clipping shingles - Lester Shingle Mill, Sweet Home, Linn County, Oregon.

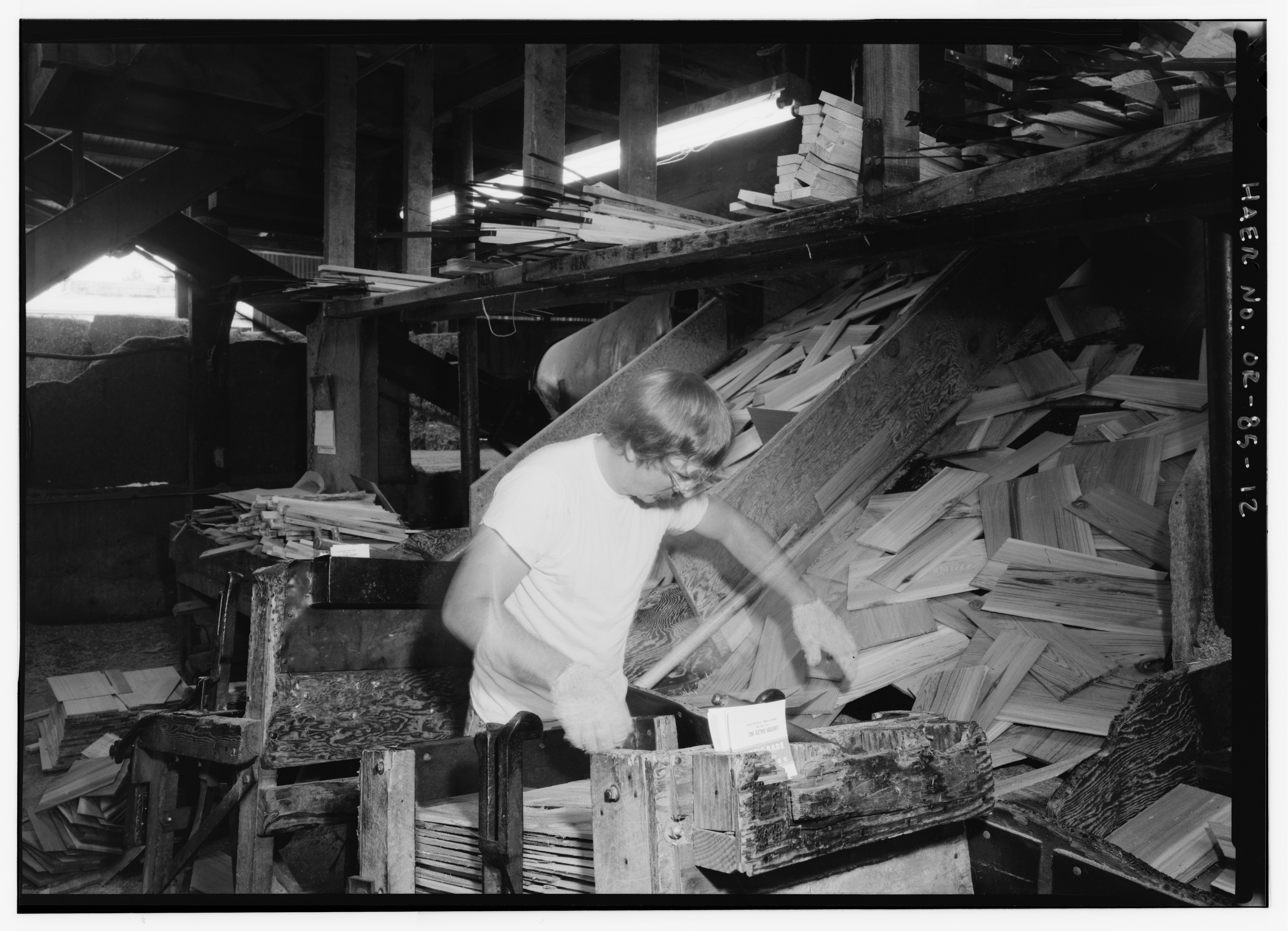
A shingle weaver "weaving" shingles into bundles.

A shingle weaver (US) or shingler (UK) is an employee of a wood products mill who engages in the creation of wooden roofing shingles or the closely related product known as "shakes." In the Pacific Northwest region of the United States, historically the leading producer of this product, such shingles are generally made of western red cedar, an aromatic and disease-resistant wood indigenous to the area. The use of the term "weaver" for a shingle maker related to the way in which the workers fitted the shingles together in bundles but the meaning has extended to anyone who works in a shingle mill.

== Historical overview ==
=== Early manufacturing process ===
During the late 19th and early 20th Century, the production of wooden roofing shingles was an extremely dangerous process in which the shingle weaver hand-fed pieces of raw wood onto an automated saw. Despite the danger of the profession, the industry was a large one throughout Washington and Oregon, and by 1893 Washington state alone had 150 mills which converted Western Red Cedar into shingles and shakes for the roofing and siding of American homes.

The craft of shingle making demanded a high skill level and considerable manual dexterity. An alternative origin for the name "weaver" is that it was this nimble motion of the hands of the sawyers around the spinning blades of their saws that provided the origin of the term for the maker of shingles — the woodworkers being likened to skilled operators of looms.

Sunset magazine described the job of the shingle weavers for its readers:

"The saw on his left sets the pace. If the singing blade rips 50 rough shingles off the block every minute, the sawyer must reach over to its teeth 50 times in 60 seconds; if the automatic carriage feeds the odorous wood 60 times into the hungry teeth, 60 times he must reach over, turn the shingle, trim its edge on the gleaming saw in front of him, cut the narrow strip containing the knot hole with two quick movements of his right hand, and toss the completed board down the chute to the packers, meanwhile keeping eyes and ears open for the sound that asks him to feed a new block into the untiring teeth. Hour after hour the shingle weaver's hands and arms, plain, unarmored flesh and blood, are staked against the screeching steel that cares not what it severs. Hour after hour the steel sings its crescendo note as it bites into the wood, the sawdust cloud thickens, the wet sponge under the sawyer's nose fills with fine particles.

"If 'cedar asthma,' the shingle weaver's occupational disease, does not get him, the steel will. Sooner or later he reaches over a little too far, the whirling blade tosses drops of deep red into the air, and a finger, a hand, or part of an arm comes sliding down the slick chute."

=== Unionization efforts ===
The first attempt to unionize shingle weavers came in Michigan in 1886. This union lasted only a few years, due in large measure to the industry moving westward to the new state of Washington, which entered the United States as the 42nd state in November 1889.

In the Pacific Northwest, shingle weavers began to unionize as early as 1890, when the shingle weavers of the Puget Sound area of Western Washington banded together to establish the West Coast Shingle Weavers’ Union. In short order, locals of the union were established in Ballard, Tacoma, Snohomish, Arlington, Chehalis, and Sedro-Woolley. This first foray into craft unionism proved to be short-lived, however, as an ill-timed strike crushed by an economic downturn in 1893 effectively put an end to the organizing effort.

In 1901 a more successful attempt at unionization of the shingle makers' trade was made with the establishment of the International Shingle Weavers of America.

In January 1903 a newspaper called The Shingle Weaver was established in Ballard as the official journal of the new union. The paper later moved to Everett, Washington and finally to Seattle during the course of its decade of publication before changing its name to The Timber Worker in February 1913.

In 1915, a wage cut for shingle weavers in the mills of Everett, Washington began a process of events which led to a strike the following year by the union the Industrial Workers of the World and its suppression by force and violence. On November 5, 1916, events culminated in a pitched gun battle known to history as the "Everett massacre," in which 5 strikers and 2 so-called "citizen deputies" were killed and approximately 45 others wounded.
