= Magnolia (steamboat) =

1907–1937 steamship used on Puget Sound

- Magnolia circa 1912.

History
- Name: Magnolia
- Owner: Tacoma & Burton Navigation Co.
- Route: Puget Sound
- Completed: 1907, Tacoma
- Out of service: 1937
- Fate: Abandoned

General characteristics
- Length: 112 ft (34.1 m)
- Installed power: steam engine
- Propulsion: propeller

Magnolia was a wooden-hulled steamship that operated on Puget Sound from 1907 to 1937.

== Career ==
Magnolia was built at Tacoma in 1907 for the Tacoma and Burton Navigation Company, which intended her to replace Burton on the company's routes around Tacoma and Vashon Island. The company's chief rival was the Vashon Navigation Company, which ran the steamer Vashon, under Captain Chauncey "Chance" Wyman. Once launched, Magnolia, under Capt. Fred Sutter, raced Vashon daily between landings to be the first boat to pick up the business. By 1909, the rate wars had died down, and Magnolia and Vashon were running on different schedules.

Magnolia had been transferred to the route between Seattle and Olympia. For a time in 1911, the steamer Nisqually was run on the same route, but when Nisqually was taken off the route and sent to the Columbia River, Magnolia became the last steamboat to make the Seattle-Olympia run. As passenger fares fell off, Magnolia was converted to a towboat.
