= Burton (steamboat) =

1905 steamboat in United States

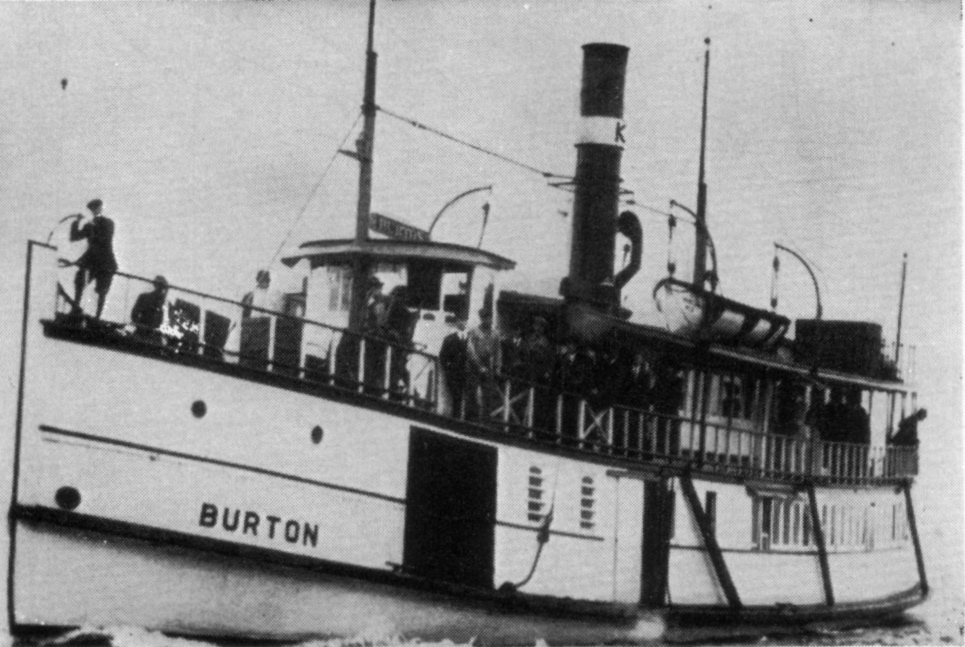
- Burton

History
- Name: Burton
- Owner: Tacoma & Burton Navigation Co.; Kitsap County Transportation Co.
- Route: Puget Sound
- Completed: 1905
- Out of service: 1924
- Fate: Burned 1924

General characteristics
- Length: 93 ft (28.3 m)
- Installed power: Steam engine, later diesel
- Propulsion: Propeller

Burton was a steamboat built in 1905 in Tacoma, Washington and which was in service on Puget Sound until 1924.

== Career ==
Burton was built for the Tacoma and Burton Navigation Company, whose principals had once been partners with the owners of a rival steamer Norwood on runs from Tacoma to points on Vashon Island. Burton was intended to compete with Norwood. Once Burton was completed, daily competition for fares meant both steamers were racing each other from landing to landing. Norwood was soon replaced with the faster and newer Vashon, and the racing continued with Burton every day until 1907, when Burton was replaced on the route by Magnolia. Burton was sold to the Kitsap County Transportation Company (KCTC) in 1912. By 1924, Burton had been taken out of service, and was laid up in Gig Harbor, and in that year a fire started on board and destroyed the vessel.

Burton is reported to have been owned by KCTC from 1907 to 1911 and from 1912 to 1923.

== See also ==
- Puget Sound Mosquito Fleet
