= Florence J. =

1913-14 American gasoline-powered vessel

- Above: Oil service vessel Florence J. just before launch. Below: just after launch, tug Stinson alongside.

History
- Name: Florence J.
- Launched: 1913 or 1914
- In service: 1913
- Identification: US registry # 211771

General characteristics
- Type: oil service vessel
- Tonnage: 49 gross; 33 regist.
- Length: 72 ft (21.95 m)
- Beam: 19.8 ft (6.04 m)
- Depth: 5.7 ft (1.74 m)
- Installed power: gasoline engine, 80 hp (60 kW)
- Propulsion: propeller

Florence J. was a small gasoline-powered vessel built in 1913 or 1914 at Dockton, Washington. The vessel is chiefly remembered for having capsized immediately upon being launched.

== Career ==
Florence J. was built to replace the Rene, then owned by Union Oil Service and running on Puget Sound. The vessel was equipped with an 80-horsepower (60 kW) Frisco Standard gasoline engine. Florence J. was reported to have been a propeller-driven vessel 72 ft (21.95 m) in length and 19.8 ft (6.04 m) in width, with 5.7 ft (1.74 m) depth of hold, displacing 49 gross tons or 33 registered tons. Florence J. is also reported to have been launched in 1914.

== Launching ==
Florence J. is chiefly known for the major failure that accompanied the launching of the vessel, which was recorded by the important Puget Sound maritime photographer Asahel Curtis.

== Name change ==
In 1920 the vessel's name is recorded as having been changed to Despatch No. 5.
