= Calista (steamboat) =

Small steamboat of the Puget Sound Mosquito Fleet

- Calista

History
- Name: Calista
- Route: Puget Sound
- Completed: 1911, Dockton
- Out of service: 1924
- Fate: Wrecked 1924

General characteristics
- Length: 117 ft (35.7 m)
- Installed power: steam engine
- Propulsion: propeller

The steamship Calista was a small steamboat of the Puget Sound Mosquito Fleet.

== Career ==
Calista was built in 1911 at the Martinolich shipyard at Dockton, Washington.

The vessel is best known for an event which occurred on November 5, 1916. The vessel, preceded by the steamboat Verona was transporting members of the Industrial Workers of the World from Seattle to Everett, Washington, in connection with a labor dispute. On the arrival of Verona in Everett, a shooting broke out which has since become known as the Everett Massacre. Because of the shooting, Verona did not land her IWW passengers in Everett, and returned to Seattle. On the return, Verona encountered Calista bound for Everett, and warned Calista not to proceed. Calista then reversed course and returned to Seattle.

Calista was wrecked in 1924.
