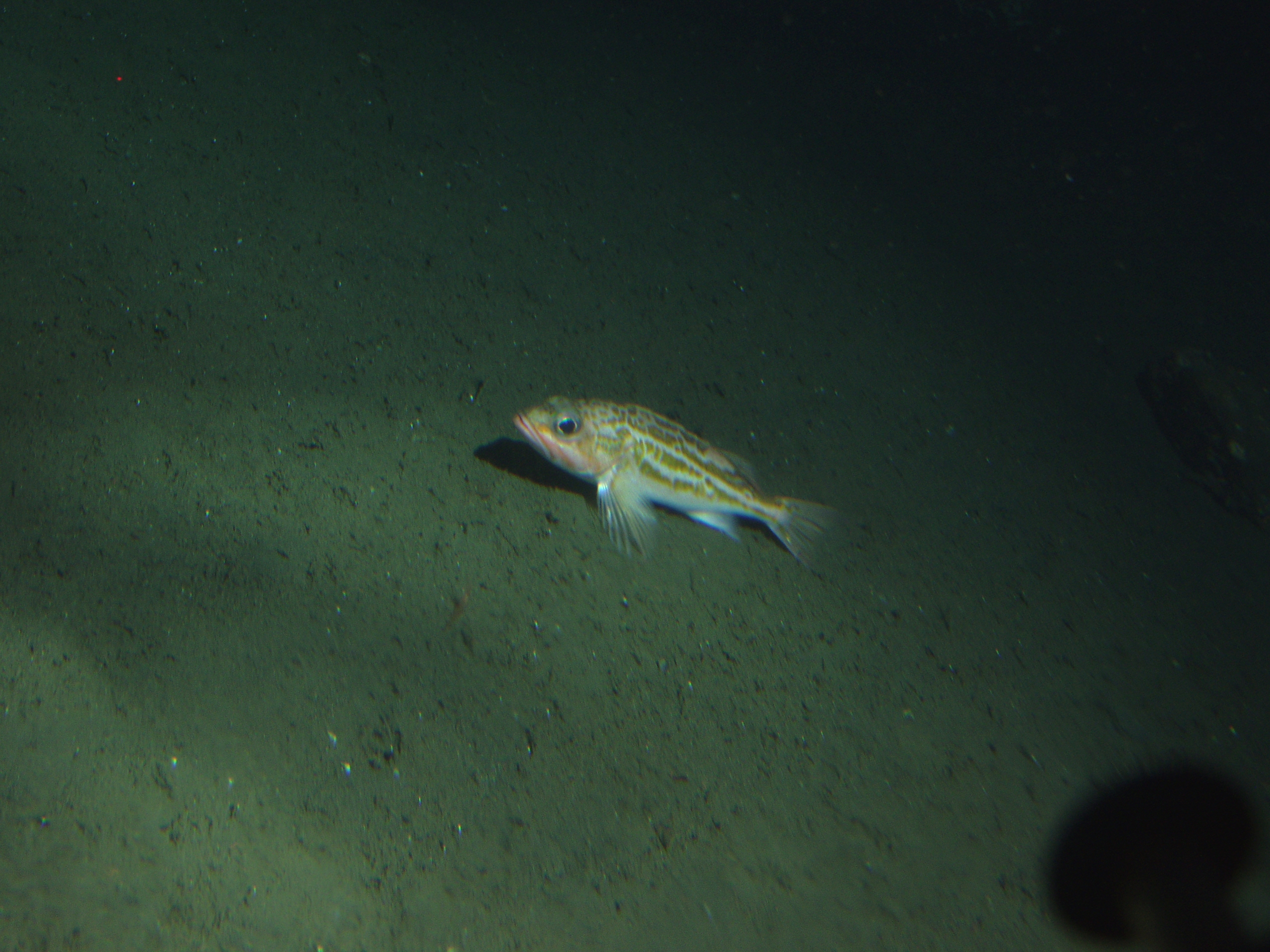

Scientific classification
- Kingdom: Animalia
- Phylum: Chordata
- Class: Actinopterygii
- Order: Perciformes
- Family: Scorpaenidae
- Genus: Sebastes
- Species: S. elongatus

Binomial name
- Sebastes elongatus Ayres, 1859

Synonyms
- Sebastodes elongatus (Ayres, 1859)

= Sebastes elongatus =

Species of fish

Sebastes elongatus, the greenstriped rockfish, striped rockfish, strawberry rockfish, poinsettias, reina or serena, is a species of marine ray-finned fish belonging to the subfamily Sebastinae, the rockfishes, part of the family Scorpaenidae. It is found in the northeastern Pacific Ocean.

== Taxonomy ==
Sebastes elongatus was first formally described in 1859 by the American physician and ichthyologist William Orville Ayres with the type locality given as San Francisco, California. Some authorities classify this species in the subgenus Hispaniscus. The specific name elongatus means "elongate", a reference to the slenderer form of this species in comparison to the other Sebastes rockfishes then known from off San Francisco.

== Description ==
Sebastes elongatus has a comparatively slender, elongated, scaly, body which has a depth of around one-third of its standard length with a moderately sized head and eyes. There are venom glands in the spines of the dorsal, anal and pelvic fins. The caudal fin is truncate to weakly crescent shaped. On the head the nasal, preocular, postocular, tympanic and parietal spines are robust and present while the supraocular, coronal and nuchal spines are absent. The dorsal fin has 13 spines and 12-14 soft rays while the anal fin has 3 spines and 6 soft rays. This species attains a maximum total length of 39 cm (15 in) and a maximum published weight of 630 g (22 oz). The color of the body is white to reddish marked with four very clear longitudinal green stripes, two either side of the lateral line. There is green streaking on the membranes of the caudal fin membranes with a red streak on the maxilla.

== Distribution and habitat ==
Sebastes elongatus is found in the northeastern Pacific Ocean off the western coast of North America between Chirikof Island in the Gulf of Alaska to Cedros Island in Baja California. It is a demersal fish which has a depth range of 25 to 425 m (82 to 1,394 ft) but more typically between 91 and 366 m (299 and 1,201 ft). It is found in both inshore and offshore areas and on rocky and soft substrates.

== Biology ==
Sebastes elongatus is a long-lived species which has maximum observed ages greater than 50 years, with 54 years old being the oldest recorded age. The females are larger than the males, but both sexes usually attain sexual maturity ay about the same size, between 18 and 24 cm (7.1 and 9.4 in), when they are aged between 7 and 10 years. Sexual maturity occurs at smaller sizes in the more southerly parts of its range. It is an ovoviviparous species in which fertilization is internal and the females give birth to larvae, breeding peaking in December through to February, although in more southern areas breeding is between January and July. Females can store sperm without fertilizing eggs after copulation. Juveniles settle on the seabed when they reach roughly 3 cm (1.2 in) in length, during the fall and are frequently recorded where fine sand and clay border. As the adults mature they normally move towards deeper water. They feed both in the water column and from the substrate, preying on other fishes, krill, shrimps, copepods, amphipods, and squid. In turn they are preyed on by other fishes, including commercially important species like chinook salmon (Oncorhynchus tshawytscha). Where reefs have small numbers of large piscivorous fishes there are typically larger numbers of small rockfishes than on reefs where there are large numbers of large piscivorous fishes.

== Fisheries ==
Sebastes elongatus is caught as bycatch and has little market value because it is a rather small species of rockfish and it has been reported that fillets do not have a long shelf life. These characteristics mean that no targeted fishery for this species has developed on a long term basis. They are, however, frequently recorded in landings from fisheries targeting other species, albeit in small numbers. They are found most frequently in trawl fisheries and are frequently taken by recreational fishers, particularly when the boats drift near rocks.
