= Verona (steamship) =

1910 steamboat used in Puget Sound

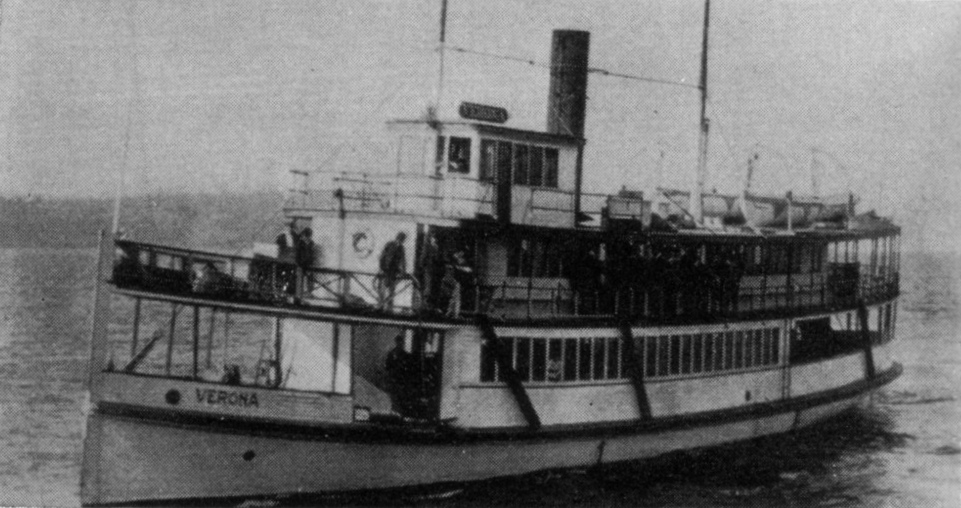
- Verona

History
- Name: Verona
- Owner: Union Nav. Co.; Kitsap County Trans. Co.
- Route: Puget Sound
- Completed: 1910, Dockton
- Out of service: 1936
- Fate: Dismantled.

General characteristics
- Length: 112.9 ft (34.4 m)
- Beam: 22.8 ft (6.9 m)
- Depth: 7.3 ft (2.2 m) depth of hold
- Installed power: steam engine
- Propulsion: propeller

The steamship Verona was a small steamboat of the Puget Sound Mosquito Fleet.

== Career ==
Verona was built in 1910 at the Martinolich shipyard at Dockton, Washington. The vessel is best known for an event which occurred on November 5, 1916. The vessel was transporting members of the Industrial Workers of the World to Everett, Washington, in connection with a labor dispute. On arrival in Everett, a shooting broke out which has since become known as the Everett Massacre. In 1923 Verona was owned by the Union Navigation Company, a Poulsbo concern, which in that year sold the vessel to Kitsap County Transportation Co. From 1935 to 1936 Verona was owned by the Puget Sound Navigation Company.

== Disposition ==
The aging Verona burned after completing its last night run from Bainbridge Island on Jan 10, 1936. Fireboats concentrated on saving nearby steamers.

== See also ==
- Calista (steamboat)
