= Martinolich Shipbuilding Company =

Defunct American shipbuilding comopany

- Martinolich shipyard circa 1900
- Founded: 1905
- Defunct: 1974
- Headquarters: Dockton, Washington, San Francisco

The Martinolich Shipbuilding Company was founded in the early 1900s by John Martinolich (1877-1960), an Italian immigrant from modern day Croatia.

== Course of business ==
The company's original shipyard was at Dockton, Washington, but later expanded to other locations. The company was active from 1904 to 1974 and built many vessels.

Among the earlier vessels built by the company were the wooden propeller steamers Vashon (1905), Verona (1910), Nisqually (later renamed Astorian) and Calista, both built in 1911, Florence J. (1914), F.G. Reeves, (1916), Vashona (later renamed Sightseer) (1921), and the ferry Whidby (1923).

== San Francisco ==
In 1943 Martinolich San Francisco location built for the US army Self-Propelled Barge. Built were hull ID BSP-1046 to BSP-1055. These were wood a hull design, type 291, and had a length of 105 feet.
