= Taiheiyo Cement =

Japanese cement company

Taiheiyo Cement Corporation
- Type: Public KK
- Traded as: TYO: 5233; FSE: 5233; Nikkei 225 Component
- Industry: Construction materials
- Founded: (May 1881; 145 years ago)
- Headquarters: Daiba Garden City Building, 2-3-5, Daiba, Minato-ku, Tokyo 135-8578 Japan
- Key people: Keiji Tokuue (Chairman of the Board); Shuji Fukuda (President)
- Products: Cement; Ready-mix concrete; Mined aggregates; Construction materials; Ceramic products
- Revenue: ▲US$ 8.16 billion (FY 2014) (¥ 840.28 billion) (FY 2014)
- Net income: ▲US million (FY 2014) (billion) (FY 2014)
- Number of employees: 13,087 (consolidated as of June 2014)
- Website: Official website

Taiheiyo Cement Corporation ("Pacific Ocean Cement Corporation") (太平洋セメント株式会社, Taiheiyō Semento Kabushiki-gaisha) is a Japanese cement company. It was formed in 1998 with the merger of Chichibu Onoda (itself a merger of Chichibu Cement and Onoda Cement) and Nihon Cement (formerly Asano Cement).

In July 2024, Secretary Alfredo Pascual and Mayor Mytha Ann B. Canoy graced Taiheiyo Cement Philippines, Inc.'s inauguration of a PHP12.8 billion (US$220) production line in San Fernando, Cebu. It has a capacity of 3 Mt annually, or 6000 tons per day of cement clinker and features advanced cement kiln renewal technology.

== History ==
Taiheiyo Cement was created through a series of mergers and acquisitions dating back to the establishment of the Cement Manufacturing Company (later renamed the Onoda Cement Company) in 1881. Onoda Cement purchased California Portland Cement Company from the CalMat Company in 1990 for $316 million, after having acquired a 19% stake in CalMat in 1988.

The Chichibu Cement Company was founded in 1923, and it merged with Onoda Cement in 1994 to form the Chichibu Onoda Cement Corporation.

The cement plant that later became the Nihon Cement Company was leased from the government in 1883. Nihon Cement merged with Chichibu Onoda in 1998 to form Taiheiyo Cement.

On October 1, 2026, Taiheiyo Cement acquired Tokuyama's domestic cement and soil-stabilisation materials sales business, together with certain related subsidiaries, in a transaction valued at ¥37 billion. The acquisition was completed through the purchase of all shares in Tokuyama Cement, which was renamed Tokuyama Taiheiyo on the same day.

== International subsidiaries ==
Taiheiyo Cement has a number of subsidiaries in countries around the world.

In the United States, its subsidiary Taiheiyo Cement USA, Inc., serves as the parent company of CalPortland Company.
