= Dockton, Washington =

Unincorporated community in Washington, United States

Dockton
- Unincorporated community
- Location within the state of Washington
- Coordinates: 47°22′18″N 122°27′33″W
- Country: United States
- State: Washington
- County: King
- Time zone: UTC-8 (Pacific (PST))
  - Summer (DST): UTC-7 (PDT)

Dockton is an unincorporated community in King County, Washington. It is located on Maury Island, along Quartermaster Harbor. Although once an industrial center, Dockton today is a primarily residential area, with many commuters taking the ferry to nearby Tacoma.

== History ==
Dockton, one of the first major settlements on the now-conjoined Vashon and Maury Islands, was an important shipbuilding center in the late 19th and early 20th centuries. The Puget Sound Dry Dock Company ship yard and drydock there from 1892 to 1909 was the largest on the West Coast of the United States. The drydock was 325 feet (99 m) long and 203 feet (62 m) wide.

After its closure, the Stuckey and Martinolich yards continued shipbuilding and repair at Dockton. Over the years a number of vessels were also built at the shipyard of John Martinolich, at Dockton on Maury Island. These included the propeller steamers Vashon (1905), Verona (1910), Nisqually (later renamed Astorian) and Calista, both built in 1911, Florence J. (1914), F.G. Reeves, (1916), Vashona (later renamed Sightseer) (1921), and the ferry Whidby (1923).

Launchings did not always go well. Florence J. rolled over and sank on the first launching attempt.

The last commercial boat built at Dockton was the Janet G in 1929.

In the early 1910s there was a salmon cannery at Dockton, Puget Sound fisheries peaked in 1914, but after that catches began to decline, and the cannery was closed by the end of the decade. Dockton gradually transformed into the residential community it is today.

As Dockton faded as an industrial center, its situation as a residential center was improved when King County bridged the portage between Maury Island and larger Vashon Island in 1918. The two islands were later connected by an artificial isthmus.

The Dockton Store, including a post office, opened in 1920. It was the center of the community until it closed in the 1980s. The building remains, and is listed as a King County landmark. It is the only well preserved early 20th century commercial building on Maury Island.

Other surviving remnants of Dockton's past are shipyard pilings, old piers and net houses, and the homes of the managers and foremen from the industrial days, known collectively as "Piano Row".
