= Vashon (1905 steamboat) =

Wooden steamboat

- Vashon and other vessels at Tacoma circa 1912

History
- Name: Vashon
- Owner: Vashon Navigation Company
- Route: Puget Sound
- Completed: 1905, Dockton
- Out of service: 1930
- Fate: Dismantled.

General characteristics
- Length: 94 ft (28.7 m)
- Installed power: steam engine
- Propulsion: propeller

Vashon was a wooden steamboat built in 1905 at Dockton, Washington on Vashon Island. The vessel was active on Puget Sound in the early decades of the 1900s. Vashon should not be confused with the sternwheeler Vashon which also ran on Puget Sound.

== Career ==
Vashon was built for the Vashon Navigation Company which was then engaged in fierce competition with the Tacoma and Burton Navigation Company for the freight and passenger business on the steamboat routes in the Tacoma and Vashon Island areas of Puget Sound. Vashon was the first steamboat constructed by the Martinolich Shipbuilding Company, which in 1904, under the company's founder, John Martinolich, a Croatian immigrant, had set up a shipyard on Vashon Island at the small settlement of Dockton.

The Vashon Navigation Company intended Vashon to replace their steamer Norwood which had not performed well against the Burton, a new vessel placed in service in 1905 by the rival Tacoma and Burton Navigation Co. Vashon competed with Burton, and later Burton's replacement, Magnolia by racing from landing to landing trying to be the first to pick up passengers or embark freight. By 1909, the rivalry had died down when Magnolia was transferred to other routes.

Vashon was dismantled in 1930.
