= CalPortland Company =

American corporation specializing in cement and other building materials

- Formerly: California Portland Cement Company (1891–2008)
- Founded: 1891; 135 years ago
- Headquarters: Summerlin, Nevada
- Parent: CalMat Company (1984–1990); Taiheiyo Cement USA (1990–pres.)

CalPortland Company, or simply CalPortland, is an American corporation that produces cement and other building materials. It was founded in 1891 and claims to be the largest such company in the Western United States. The company was founded in California but today maintains its headquarters in Summerlin, Nevada. Since 1990, it has been owned by Taiheiyo Cement, a Japanese company.

CalPortland's subsidiary in Washington state, Glacier Northwest, was a party to a 2023 Supreme Court decision, Glacier Northwest, Inc. v. Teamsters, that found that the right to strike under the National Labor Relations Act does not preclude lawsuits against the union for actions related to the strike.

== History ==
The company's history can be traced from its founding in 1891 through its growth and merger in 1984 to its purchase by its current Japanese parent, Taiheiyo Cement, in 1990.

=== Founding and growth ===
The California Portland Cement Company was incorporated on September 18, 1891, in Los Angeles County, California, with a capital stock of $500,000 ($17.9 million in 2025). Its first board of directors consisted of Los Angeles residents John P. Culver and Frank H. Jackson, and San Bernardino, California, residents Ernest Waycott, Harry R. O'Bryan, and R. H. Waycott. The company's first cement plant was at Mount Slover in Colton, California, where cement was packed in wood barrels and shipped via mule trains. By 1896, the plant was producing 400 barrels of cement per day, in addition to marble dust, lime, and other materials. A warehouse was completed in 1897 to provide storage for up to 10,000 barrels of cement, and by this time the plant had a monthly payroll of $2,000 ($77,400 in 2025).

In 1949, the company opened a plant in Rillito, Arizona, under the name Arizona Portland Cement. A third cement plant, in Mojave, California, began production in 1956.

In 1960, California Portland Cement reported net income of $7.3 million ($79.4 million in 2025). The following year, it formed a new subsidiary in Phoenix, Arizona Sand & Rock Company, to manufacture prestressed and ready-mixed concrete. By the late 1960s, profits had fallen, and the company expanded into new areas. It founded new subsidiaries such as Spancrete (hollow-core slabs and rectangular beams) in 1966, Colton Industrial Park Company (property development) in 1969, and Calport Financial Corporation (low-cost housing development and financing) in 1970. It also acquired a 54% stake in a petroleum exploration company called State Exploration in 1969.

The company further diversified in 1971 by founding the Soldier Creek Coal Company to mine coal in Utah, some of which California Portland Cement used in its own cement plants.

=== Merger to form CalMat ===
In 1984, California Portland Cement merged with Consolidated Rock Company, also based in Los Angeles, to form CalMat Company. Consolidated Rock (also known as Conrock) manufactured sand, gravel, and crushed rock. California Portland Cement shareholders owned 57% of CalMat, and Conrock shareholders the other 43%.

CalMat sold two subsidiaries in 1985: State Exploration (by then renamed Statex Petroleum) for $19.3 million and Soldier Creek Coal for $22 million. It acquired Coast Asphalt, Inc., in 1986.

The company was the target of a nearly $1 billion hostile takeover attempt by New Zealand investor Ron Brierley in March 1988. Brierley owned 19% of the company at the time, and had previously agreed not to purchase more than 20% unless he bought the entire company. He announced he would offer $40 a share, though one analyst thought the price could go as high as $50 a share if other bidders emerged. The CalMat board was not receptive to the idea, and Brierly never actually made the offer. In the end, he sold his 19% stake to Onoda Cement, a Japanese company, for $41.75 a share ($242 million). As part of the deal, Onoda Cement obtained the right to purchase California Portland Cement and 13 Los Angeles-area ready-mix concrete plants for around $310 million.

Some CalMat shareholders were angry at the deal, believing that CalMat had priced the cement business too low in order to fend off Brierley. Economics commentator Ben Stein wrote in Barron's, "It is difficult to escape the conclusion that CalMat's management sold a valuable asset at far below full value primarily to get a worrisome corporate raider and greenmailer off its back."

=== Sale to Japanese owners ===
Onoda Cement exercised its option and purchased California Portland Cement from the CalMat Company in 1990 for $316 million. Onoda Cement merged with Chichibu Cement Company in 1994, then with Nihon Cement Company in 1998 to form CalPortland's current parent company, Taiheiyo Cement. Taiheiyo Cement owns CalPortland through its Taiheiyo Cement USA subsidiary. The rest of CalMat was later acquired by Vulcan Materials Company in 1998.

California Portland Cement changed its name to CalPortland Company on June 20, 2008.

CalPortland's original plant in Colton stopped production on November 20, 2009, as the company restructured to deal with decreased demand during the Great Recession.

== Subsidiaries ==
CalPortland does business both in its own name and through subsidiaries.

=== Glacier Northwest ===
Glacier Northwest, Inc., is a subsidiary of CalPortland incorporated in Washington state. It also does business as CalPortland. Its history can be traced back to the 1890s and some of the early building projects around Puget Sound.

==== History ====
In the 1890s, the U.S. Government was building three new forts to protect the entrance to Puget Sound: Fort Worden, Fort Flagler, and Fort Casey. One of the main contractors, the Pacific Bridge Company, needed high-quality gravel to produce large quantities of concrete. After investigating a number of unsuitable sites, the company found a large quantity of suitable gravel on the waterfront near Steilacoom, Washington, and began to mine there. Once construction of the forts was completed, Martin Sand & Gravel Company acquired the mine; sources differ on whether this occurred in 1899 or 1905.

By 1907, two more mines had opened near Martin's property, operated by the Seattle Sand & Gravel Company and Independent Asphalt Paving Company. The three companies united to form the Pioneer Sand & Gravel Company in either 1907 or 1910, in order to push back against railroad companies in a dispute over a right of way through their properties. Another company, Glacier Sand & Gravel, began mining on the south side of the Steilacoom site in 1910.

The company grew, and by 1927 had six storage bunkers in Seattle, as well as in Bremerton, Olympia, Tacoma, Everett, Bellingham, Raymond, and Longview. Pioneer Sand & Gravel supplied sand and gravel for area projects such as Seattle Civic Auditorium, the Lake Washington Floating Bridge, the Aurora Bridge, Husky Stadium, and the dry docks at Puget Sound Naval Shipyard, and also offered structural steel and other building materials.

In 1959, Pioneer Sand & Gravel Company had net income of $201,342 ($2.22 million in 2025) on sales of $5.9 million ($65.2 million in 2025) and its mine at Steilacoom had grown to become one of the largest in the world. Lone Star Cement of New York, the largest producer of cement in the U.S. at the time, acquired the company on December 1 of that year. The purchase price was $3,920,000 ($43.3 million in 2025).

==== Glacier Northwest, Inc. v. Teamsters ====
On August 11, 2017, in the midst of contract negotiations between Glacier Northwest and Teamsters Local 174, which represented the company's 80 to 90 truck drivers, the truck drivers went on strike. Some of the drivers did not complete their deliveries and returned their trucks with concrete still in the mixing drums. Concrete begins to harden 20 to 30 minutes after mixing stops, and the trucks would have been damaged if the concrete hardened inside. The company took emergency measures to clean out the trucks, but lost the value of the undelivered concrete. A new contract between the company and the Teamsters was ratified on August 18, and a large concrete pour was scheduled for the following morning in Seattle's South Lake Union neighborhood. Only 11 of the estimated 40 to 50 drivers needed showed up in time to perform the pour, contrary to assurances from a union official that the workers would respond to the work dispatch. Canceling the job incurred $100,000 in penalties for the company, which claims the union misrepresented the workers' willingness to respond.

The company sued Local 174 for damages due to both property damage and misrepresentation in King County Superior Court; the court dismissed all of the claims against the union. Glacier Northwest appealed to the Washington Court of Appeals, which affirmed the dismissal of the misrepresentation claims but reversed the dismissal of the property damage claims related to the August 11 incident. Both parties petitioned the Washington Supreme Court to review the case, and on December 16, 2021, it dismissed all of the damage claims by the company. Glacier Northwest appealed to the Supreme Court of the United States, which on June 1, 2023, reversed and remanded the judgment of the Washington Supreme Court in an 8–1 vote, finding that the National Labor Relations Act does not preempt claims for intentional destruction of property.

== Legal issues ==
In addition to the Supreme Court case Glacier Northwest, Inc. v. Teamsters, the company has faced other allegations and legal proceedings.

In 1912, the company was the subject of a grand jury investigation along with a competitor, the Riverside Portland Cement Company (now Riverside Cement). An official with the San Bernardino Water Board accused the companies of price fixing after learning San Bernardino was being charged $2.45 per barrel ($81.74 in 2025) while the price was only $2 per barrel in Los Angeles, despite the companies' plants being closer to San Bernardino. The companies denied the claim, saying competition had actually brought prices down from $4 to $5 a barrel a few years earlier, when most cement was imported from elsewhere.

California Portland Cement was again accused of conspiring to fix cement prices in a 1980 lawsuit, along with about 50 other defendants. The company denied any illegal activity, but paid a $6.5 million settlement for the claims, which related to the years 1968 to 1976.

The company reached an agreement with the Environmental Protection Agency and Department of Justice in December 2011 to resolve allegations it violated the Clean Air Act at its plant in Mojave. CalPortland paid $1.425 million in penalties and agreed to spend another $1.3 million to reduce emissions of nitrogen oxides and sulfur oxides.
