= List of Curculioninae genera =

These 232 genera belong to Curculioninae, a subfamily of weevils in the family Curculionidae.

== Curculioninae genera ==
- Acallopistellus Hustache, 1956^{c g}
- Acallopistus Schönherr, 1825^{c g}
- Acalyptops Hartman, 1904^{c g}
- Acalyptus Schönherr, 1833^{i c g b}
- Acentrus Desmarest, 1839^{c g}
- Achia Champion, 1903^{c g}
- Achynius Fairmaire, 1902^{c g}
- Adelus Schönherr, 1836^{c g}
- Adisius Fairmaire, 1903^{c g}
- Aetiomerus Pascoe, 1886^{c g}
- Afrogeochus Rheinheimer, 1998^{c g}
- Afrosmicronyx Hustache, 1935^{g}
- Alloprocas Broun, 1893^{c g}
- Amorphoidea Motschoulsky, 1858^{c g}
- Anarciarthrum Blackburn, 1890^{c g}
- Anchonocranus Marshall, 1912^{c g}
- Anchylorhynchus Schönherr, 1833^{c g}
- Ancylocnemis Marshall, 1920^{c g}
- Andranthobius Kuschel, 1952^{g}
- Aneuma Pascoe, 1876^{c g}
- Anoplus Germar, 1820^{c g}
- Anthonomopsis Dietz, 1891^{i c g b}
- Anthonomus Germar, 1817^{i c g b}
- Aporotaxus Perroud & Montrouzier, 1864^{c g}
- Arthriticosoma Lea, 1899^{c g}
- Assuanensius Pic, 1916^{c g}
- Atractomerus Duponchel & Chevrolat, 1849^{c g b}
- Aubeonymus Jacquelin du Val, 1855^{c g}
- Botanebius Schoenherr, 1835^{c g}
- Brachonyx Schönherr, 1825^{c g}
- Brachyogmus Linell, 1897^{i c g b}
- Bradybatus Germar, 1824^{c g}
- Buttikoferia Roelofs, 1892^{c g}
- Byrsodes Marshall, 1939^{c g}
- Cassythicola Lea, 1910^{c g}
- Celetes Schönherr, 1836^{c g}
- Celetotelus Broun, 1893^{c g}
- Ceratopus Schönherr, 1843^{c g}
- Chelonychus Dietz, 1891^{i c g b}
- Chelotonyx Waterhouse, 1853^{c g}
- Cionellus ^{c}
- Cionesthes Fairmaire, 1902^{c g}
- Cionomimus Marshall, 1939^{i c g b}
- Cionopsis Champion, 1903^{i c g b}
- Cionus Clairville, 1798^{i c g b}
- Cisowhitea Lea, 1915^{c g}
- Cleopomiarus Pierce, 1919^{c g b}
- Cleopus Dejean, 1821^{c g}
- Coccotorus LeConte, 1876^{i c g b}
- Colabus Schönherr, 1843^{c g}
- Cotithene Voss, 1940^{g}
- Cranopoeus Marshall, 1931^{c g}
- Craspedotus Schönherr, 1844^{c g}
- Cratopechus Marshall, 1928^{c g}
- Cratoscelocis Lea, 1927^{c g}
- Cremastorhynchus Scudder, 1893^{c g}
- Cryptoplus Erichson, 1842^{c g}
- Cycloporopterus Lea, 1908^{c g}
- Cydmaea Pascoe, 1872^{c g}
- Derelomus Schönherr, 1825^{i c g b}
- Diapelmus Erichson, 1842^{c g}
- Dicomada Pascoe, 1873^{c g}
- Dietzianus Sleeper, 1953^{i b}
- Dyschoenium Blackburn, 1890^{c g}
- Ecnomorhinus Vanin, 1986^{c g}
- Elaeidobius Kuschel, 1952^{b}
- Electrotribus Hustache, 1942^{g}
- Elleschodes Blackburn, 1897^{c g}
- Ellescina ^{b}
- Empira Pascoe, 1874^{c g}
- Emplesis Pascoe, 1870^{c g}
- Empolis Blackburn, 1890^{c g}
- Encosmia Blackburn, 1893^{c g}
- Eniopea Pascoe, 1873^{c g}
- Epacticus Blackburn, 1893^{c g}
- Epaetius Kuschel, 1952^{c g}
- Epamoebus Blackburn, 1893^{c g}
- Epembates Kuschel, 1952^{c g}
- Ephelops Dietz, 1891^{i c g b}
- Epimechus Dietz, 1891^{i c g b}
- Eristinus Lea, 1915^{c g}
- Erodiscus Schönherr, 1825^{c g}
- Erytenna Pascoe, 1870^{c g}
- Ethadomorpha Blackburn, 1901^{c g}
- Eudela Pascoe, 1885^{c g}
- Eudelodes Zimmerman, 1994^{c g}
- Euhackeria Lea, 1910^{c g}
- Euryscapoides Wibmer & O'Brien, 1986^{g}
- Euthebus Pascoe, 1870^{c g}
- Exotorrhamphus Voss, 1957^{c g}
- Geochus Broun, 1882^{c g}
- Geranorhinus Chevrolat, 1860^{c g}
- Gerynassa Pascoe, 1873^{c g}
- Glaucopela Pascoe, 1874^{c g}
- Griphosternus Heller, 1916^{c g}
- Gymnetron Schoenherr, 1825^{i c g}
- Hammatostylus Champion, 1903^{c g}
- Haplonyx Schoenherr, 1836^{c g}
- Hedychrous Marshall, 1923^{c g}
- Helaeniella Hustache, 1956^{c g}
- Huaca Clark, 1993^{i c g b}
- Hybomorphus Saunders & Jekel, 1855^{c g}
- Hybophorus Waterhouse, 1853^{c g}
- Hypoleschus Fall, 1907^{i g b}
- Hypotagea Pascoe, 1876^{c g}
- Hypsomus Schönherr, 1836^{c g}
- Imathia Pascoe, 1885^{c g}
- Ita Tournier, 1878^{c g}
- Ixamine Pascoe, 1870^{c g}
- Laemomerus Kirsch, 1874^{c g}
- Lancearius Vanin, 1986^{c g}
- Lepidoops Hustache, 1933^{c g}
- Leucomelacis Lea, 1928^{c g}
- Lexithia Pascoe, 1870^{c g}
- Lignyodina ^{b}
- Lonchophorellus Clark, 1989^{c g}
- Loncophorus Chevrolat, 1832^{c g}
- Ludovix Laporte de Castelnau, 1840^{c g}
- Lybaeba Pascoe, 1873^{c g}
- Macrobrachonyx Pic, 1902^{c g}
- Macrorhoptus LeConte, 1876^{i c g b}
- Madecastyphlus Richard, 1979^{c g}
- Magdalinops Dietz, 1891^{i c g b}
- Malaiserhinus Kuschel, 1952^{c g}
- Mecinus Germar, 1821^{i c g b}
- Melanterius Erichson, 1842^{c g}
- Melexerus Burke, 1982^{c g}
- Menesinus Faust, 1898^{c g}
- Merocarterus Hustache, 1956^{c g}
- Miarus Schönherr, 1825^{i c g}
- Micraonychus Lea, 1915^{c g}
- Microberosiris Lea, 1907^{c g}
- Micromyrmex Sleeper, 1953^{i c g b}
- Microstylus Schönherr, 1847^{c g}
- Misophrice Pascoe, 1872^{c g}
- Misophricoides Rheinheimer, 1990^{c g}
- Myllorhinus Boisduval, 1835^{c g}
- Myrmex Sturm, 1826^{i c g b}
- Nanops Dietz, 1891^{i c g b}
- Narberdia Burke, 1976^{i c g b}
- Nedyleda Pascoe, 1872^{c g}
- Neoderelomus Hoffmann, 1938^{g}
- Neomastix Dietz, 1891^{i c g b}
- Neomelanterius Lea, 1899^{c g}
- Neomycta Pascoe, 1877^{c g}
- Neosharpia Hoffmann, 1956^{c g}
- Neosphinctocraerus Hustache, 1939^{c g}
- Nerthops Schoenherr, 1826^{c g}
- Niseida Pascoe, 1885^{c g}
- Nothofaginoides Kuschel, 1952^{c g}
- Nothofaginus Kuschel, 1952^{c g}
- Nothofagobius Kuschel, 1952^{c g}
- Notolomus LeConte, 1876^{i g b}
- Olanaea Pascoe, 1873^{c g}
- Olbiodorus Blackburn, 1893^{c g}
- Omogonus Chevrolat, 1878^{c g}
- Onychocnemis Marshall, 1917^{c g}
- Oopterinus Casey, 1892^{i c g b}
- Orichora Pascoe, 1870^{c g}
- Orthochaetes ^{c g}
- Pachytrichus Schönherr, 1836^{c g}
- Pachytychius Jekel, 1861^{i c g b}
- Palontus Kuschel, 1990^{c g}
- Pansmicrus Schönherr, 1848^{c g}
- Paranerthops Hustache, 1920^{c g}
- Paranoplus Hustache, 1920^{c g}
- Paraphilernus Desbrochers, 1892^{c g}
- Parendoeopsis Hustache, 1920^{c g}
- Parimera Faust, 1896^{c g}
- Paroryx ^{c}
- Paryzeta Pascoe, 1873^{c g}
- Patialus Pajni, Kumar & Rose, 1991^{c g}
- Perelleschus Wibmer & O'Brien, 1986^{g}
- Phacellopterus Schönherr, 1847^{c g}
- Phaeodica Pascoe, 1874^{c g}
- Phaunaeus Lea, 1910^{c g}
- Philernus Schoenherr, 1835^{c g}
- Phyllotrox Schönherr, 1843^{i c g b}
- Phytotribus Schönherr, 1843^{c g}
- Piazorhinus Schönherr, 1835^{i c g b}
- Pimelerodius Vanin, 1986^{c g}
- Placorrhinus Marshall, 1948^{c g}
- Plaesiorhinus Blackburn, 1893^{c g}
- Praolepra Broun, 1880^{c g}
- Prionobrachium Faust, 1894^{c g}
- Promecotarsus Casey, 1892^{i c g b}
- Prosicoderus Vanin, 1986^{c g}
- Pseudanthonomus Dietz, 1891^{i c g b}
- Pseuderodiscus Heller, 1932^{c g}
- Pseudodesmidophorus Hustache, 1920^{c g}
- Pseudopoophagus Voss, 1935^{c g}
- Pseudostoreus Lea, 1899^{c g}
- Pseudostyphlus Tournier, 1874^{c g}
- Ptinopsis Champion, 1906^{c g}
- Pyropus Schoenherr, 1836^{c g}
- Rhinidotasia Lea, 1928^{c g}
- Salsolia Bajtenov, 1978^{c g}
- Sharpia Tournier, 1873^{c g}
- Sicoderus Vanin, 1986^{i c g b}
- Sidomenia Laporte, 1840^{c g}
- Sigastus Pascoe, 1865^{c g}
- Simachus Broun, 1886^{c g}
- Smicraulax Pierce, 1908^{i c g b}
- Smicronyx Schönherr, 1843^{i c g b}
- Smicrorhynchus Scudder, 1893^{c g}
- Spanochelus Marshall, 1931^{c g}
- Sphincticraeropsis Voss, 1944^{c g}
- Sphincticraerus Marseul, 1871^{g}
- Stelechodes Faust, 1899^{c g}
- Stenotypus Marshall, 1957^{c g}
- Stereonychidius Morimoto, 1962^{c g}
- Stereonychus Suffrian, 1854^{c g}
- Storeus Schoenherr, 1843^{c g}
- Strabonus Kuschel, 2008^{g}
- Styphlidius Penecke, 1936^{c g}
- Styphlus Schönherr, 1826^{c g}
- Sucinostyphlus Kuska, 1996^{c g}
- Swezeyella Zimmerman, 1942^{c g}
- Symbothynus Blackburn, 1890^{c g}
- Synnadophila Voss, 1937^{c g}
- Teridates Champion, 1903^{c g}
- Terires Champion, 1902^{c g}
- Teutheria Pascoe, 1875^{c g}
- Thaumastophasis Wollaston, 1873^{c g}
- Themelia Blackburn, 1894^{c g}
- Topelatus Hustache, 1920^{c g}
- Tychiina Gistel, 1848^{b}
- Ulomascus Fairmaire, 1848^{c g}
- Usingerius Zimmerman, 1942^{c g}
- Wittmerius Kuschel, 1952^{c g}
- Zeopus Pascoe, 1872^{c g}

Data sources: i = ITIS, c = Catalogue of Life, g = GBIF, b = Bugguide.net
