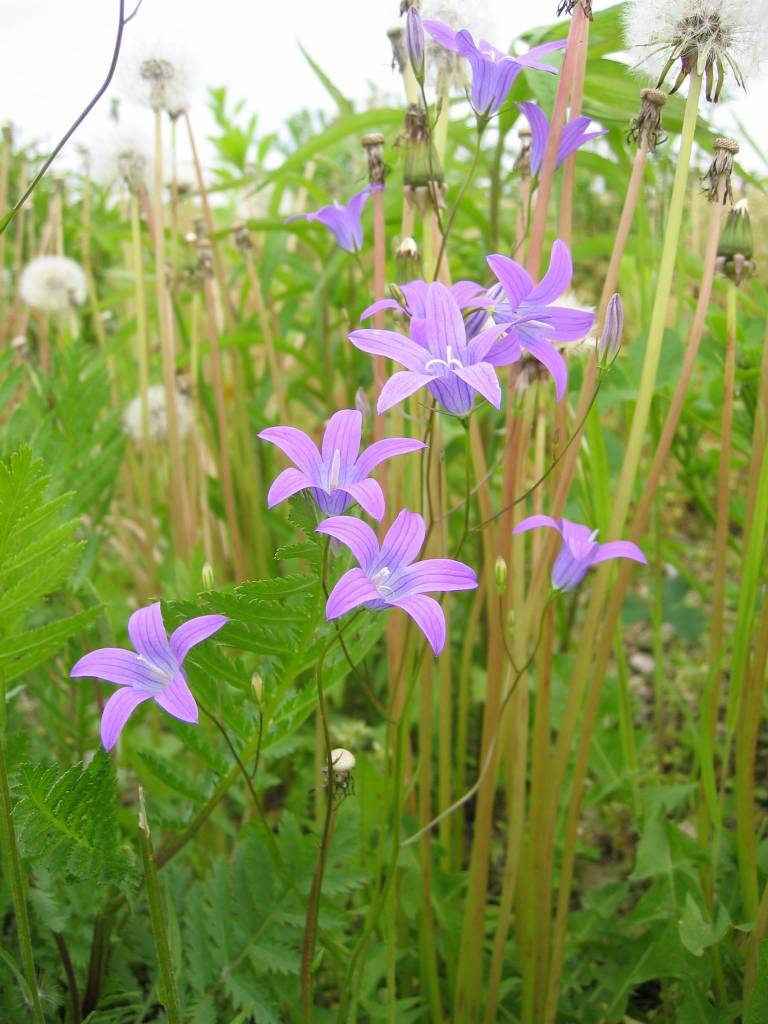

Scientific classification
- Kingdom: Plantae
- Clade: Embryophytes
- Clade: Tracheophytes
- Clade: Angiosperms
- Clade: Eudicots
- Clade: Asterids
- Order: Asterales
- Family: Campanulaceae
- Genus: Campanula
- Species: C. patula

Binomial name
- Campanula patula L.

= Campanula patula =

Species of flowering plant

Campanula patula or spreading bellflower is a plant species of the genus Campanula. It can grow to more than half a meter high. This delicate bellflower bears lateral branches of pale blue or white flowers that are upright and funnel shaped. The leaves are narrow and pointed. Branches are often supported by the surrounding vegetation, so the plants can appear prostrate. The main difference between this and other bellflowers is that the petals in the bell are spread out and more pointed and this gives this species its common name.

== Description ==
Spreading bellflower is a biennial herbaceous plant growing to a height of 25 to 80 centimetres (9.8 to 31.5 in). The stem is branched, erect and wiry and often reddish near the base. In its first year, this plant produces a rosette of short-stalked, slender, spatulate leaves. In the second year it sends up one or more flowering stalks. The leaves on these are alternate, linear and unstalked, the margins having rounded teeth. The inflorescence is a few-flowered terminal raceme. The calyx is fused and has five triangular lobes, sharp tipped and spreading. The corolla is five-lobed, 20 to 25 mm (0.8 to 1.0 in) long with five violet-blue (or occasionally white) fused petals. The corolla lobes are longer than they are wide. There are five stamens and a pistil formed from three fused carpels. The fruit is a strongly-veined, conical capsule. The flowering period is from June to September.

== Distribution and habitat ==
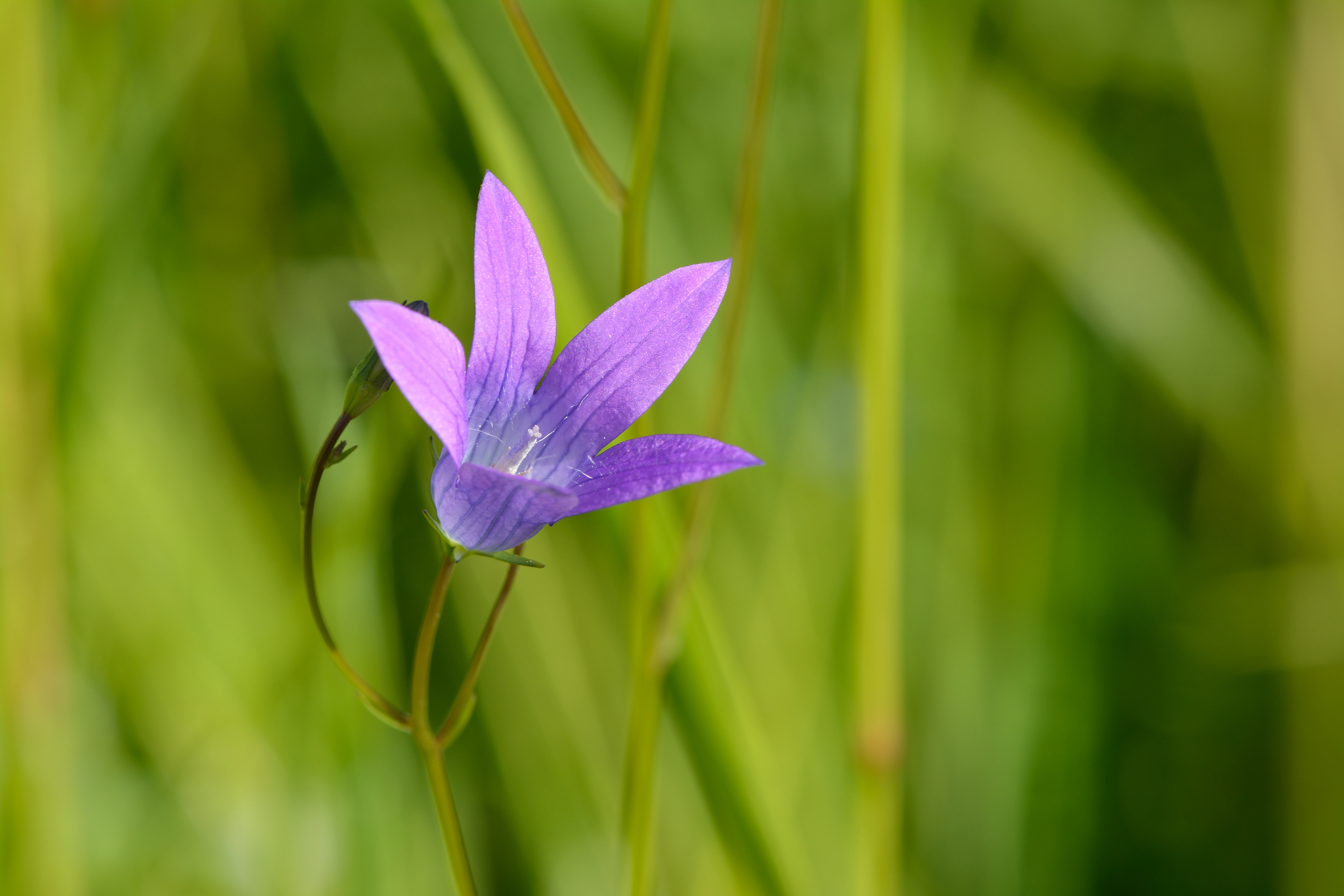
Single flower

Spreading bellflower is native to temperate parts of Europe and widely naturalised elsewhere. Its natural habitat is meadows, banks, open woodland, clearings, roadside verges, fallow fields and waste ground. In the United Kingdom it is rare in the wild, occurring mainly on infertile banks and rock outcrops. It needs light for the seeds to germinate so may reappear after many years of absence when the soil is disturbed.

A bellflower weevil in the genus Miarus is associated with this plant.
