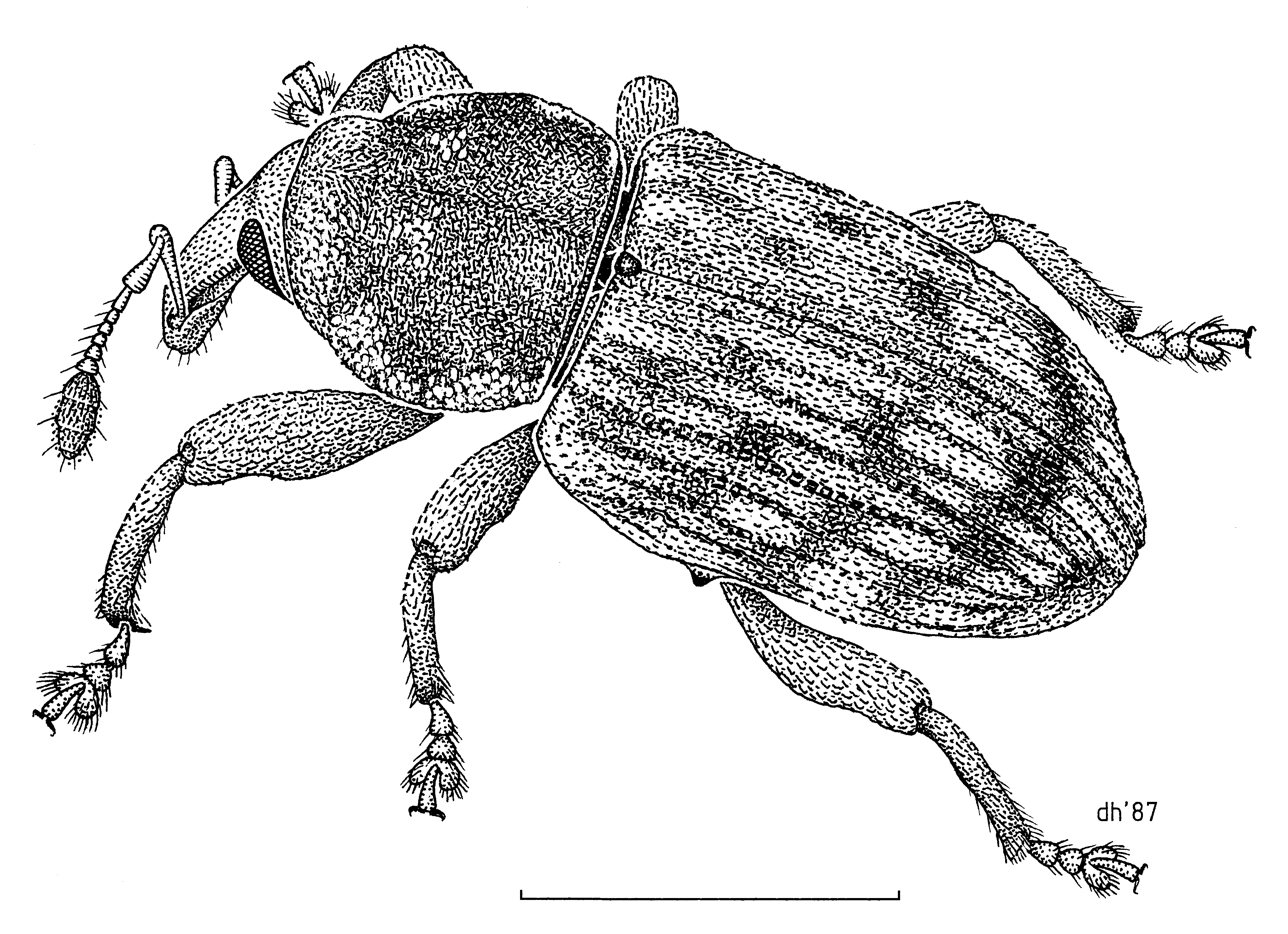
- Palontus exospermi by Des Helmore

Scientific classification
- Kingdom: Animalia
- Phylum: Arthropoda
- Class: Insecta
- Order: Coleoptera
- Suborder: Polyphaga
- Infraorder: Cucujiformia
- Family: Curculionidae
- Subfamily: Curculioninae
- Tribe: Storeini; Lacordaire, 1863

Genera
- See text

= Storeini =

Tribe of beetles

Storeini, or flower weevils, is a tribe of true weevils (Curculionidae). The taxonomy of this poorly known group is in disarray, and there are many contradictory sources of information about it.

== Genera ==
These are the included genera and authors:

- Abantiadinus (Broun, 1914)
- Abethas Zimmerman, 1999
- Aganeuma Broun, 1893
- Alloprocas Broun, 1893
- Anchonocranas Schoenherr, 1833
- Aneuma Pascoe, 1876
- Aporotaxus Perroud, 1865
- Arthriticosoma Lea, 1899
- Aubeonymus Jacquelin du Val, 1855
- Australafer Alonso-Zarazaga & Lyal, 1999
- Cassythicola Lea, 1910
- Celetotelus Broun, 1893
- Cydmaea Pascoe, 1872
- Cycloporopterus Lea, 1908
- Dicomada Pascoe, 1873
- Elleschodes Blackburn, 1897
- Emplesis Pascoe, 1870
- Erytenna Pascoe, 1870
- Euhackeria Lea, 1910
- Euprocas Broun, 1893
- Euthebus Pascoe, 1870
- Gerynassa Pascoe, 1873
- Glaucopela Pascoe, 1874
- Griphosternus Heller, 1916
- Hybomorphus Saunders & Jekel, 1855
- Hybophorus Waterhouse, 1853
- Hypotagea Pascoe, 1876
- Imathia Pascoe, 1885
- Ixamine Pascoe, 1870
- Leucomelacis Lea, 1928
- Lexithia Pascoe, 1870
- Lybaeba Pascoe, 1873
- Melanterius Erichson, 1842
- Merocarterus Hustache, 1956
- Misophrice Pascoe, 1872
- Moechias
- Neomelanterius Lea, 1899
- Neomycta Pascoe, 1877
- Notinus Kuschel, 1964
- Olanaea Pascoe, 1873
- Oropterus White, 1846
- Pachytychius Jekel, 1861
- Palontus Kuschel, 1990
- Pansmicrus Schoenherr, 1847
- Paryzeta Pascoe, 1873
- Peristoreus Kirsch, 1877
- Phorostichus Broun, 1882
- Placorrhinus Marshall, 1948
- Praolepra Broun, 1880
- Pseudostoreus Lea, 1899
- Rhinidotasia Lea, 1928
- Simachus Broun, 1886
- Stilbopsis Broun, 1893
- Storeus Schoenherr, 1843
- Terires Champion, 1902
- Teutheria Pascoe, 1875
