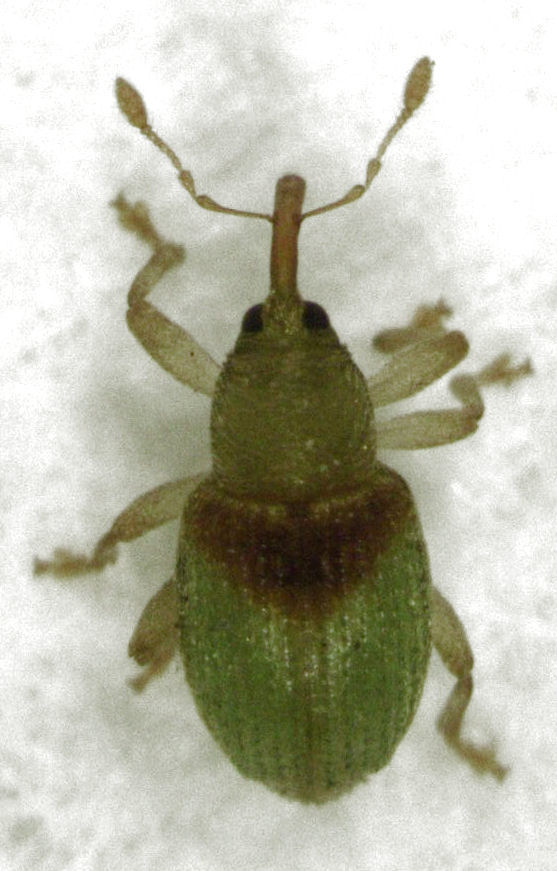
- Peristoreus viridipennis

Scientific classification
- Domain: Eukaryota
- Kingdom: Animalia
- Phylum: Arthropoda
- Class: Insecta
- Order: Coleoptera
- Suborder: Polyphaga
- Infraorder: Cucujiformia
- Family: Curculionidae
- Genus: Peristoreus
- Species: P. viridipennis

Binomial name
- Peristoreus viridipennis (Broun, 1880)

= Peristoreus viridipennis =

Species of beetle

Peristoreus viridipennis is a species of true weevil. It is endemic to New Zealand. It is associated with plants of the genus Muehlenbeckia.

P. viridipennis was originally named Erirhinus viridipennis by Thomas Broun in 1880. Then, in 1926, Guy A. K. Marshall described a new genus called Dorytomodes, into which he provisionally transferred all species placed by Broun in Erirrhinus [=Erirhinus]. Dorytomodes was subsequently sunk as a synonym of Peristoreus by Edwin S. ("Ted") Gourlay in 1950.
