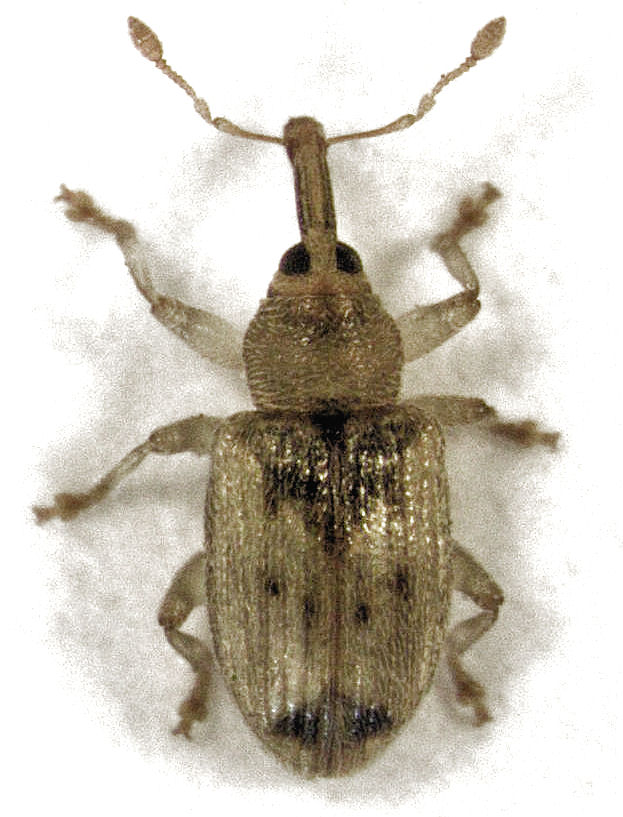
- Peristoreus stramineus

Scientific classification
- Kingdom: Animalia
- Phylum: Arthropoda
- Class: Insecta
- Order: Coleoptera
- Suborder: Polyphaga
- Infraorder: Cucujiformia
- Family: Curculionidae
- Genus: Peristoreus
- Species: P. stramineus

Binomial name
- Peristoreus stramineus (Broun, 1881)

Synonyms
- Erirhinus nocens Broun, 1881 Erirhinus subconicollis Broun, 1923

= Peristoreus stramineus =

Species of beetle

Peristoreus stramineus is a species of true weevil. It is endemic to New Zealand. The larvae develop in flower buds of Hoheria populnea.

P. stramineus was originally named Erirhinus stramineus by Broun in 1881. Then, in 1926, Marshall described a new genus called Dorytomodes, into which he provisionally transferred all species placed by Broun in Erirrhinus [=Erirhinus]. Dorytomodes was subsequently sunk as a synonym of Peristoreus by Edward S. ("Ted") Gourlay in 1950.

P. stramineus has been found in the northern North Island (including nearby offshore islands, e.g. Poor Knights), south to the Hawke's Bay Region. It has also been reported from the South Island (Banks Peninsula), as a seed predator in fruit of Hoheria angustifolia.
