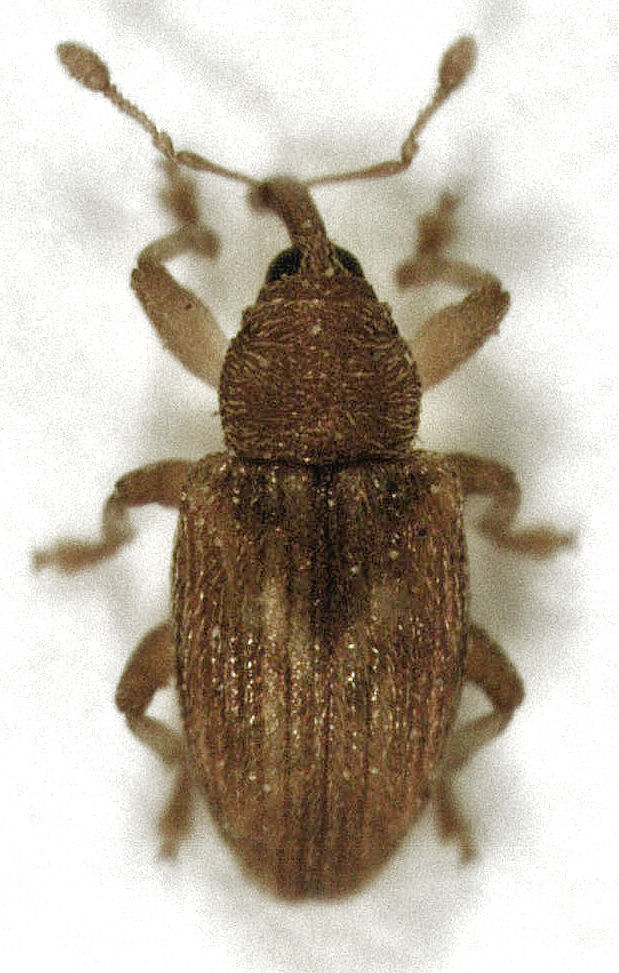
- Peristoreus fulvus

Scientific classification
- Kingdom: Animalia
- Phylum: Arthropoda
- Class: Insecta
- Order: Coleoptera
- Suborder: Polyphaga
- Infraorder: Cucujiformia
- Family: Curculionidae
- Genus: Peristoreus
- Species: P. fulvus

Binomial name
- Peristoreus fulvus (Broun, 1886)

= Peristoreus fulvus =

Species of beetle

Peristoreus fulvus is a species of true weevil. It is endemic to New Zealand. It is associated with plants of the genus Muehlenbeckia.

P. fulvus was originally named Erirhinus fulvus by Broun in 1886. Then, in 1926, Marshall described a new genus called Dorytomodes, into which he provisionally transferred all species placed by Broun in Erirrhinus [=Erirhinus]. Dorytomodes was subsequently sunk as a synonym of Peristoreus by Edward S. ("Ted") Gourlay in 1950.
