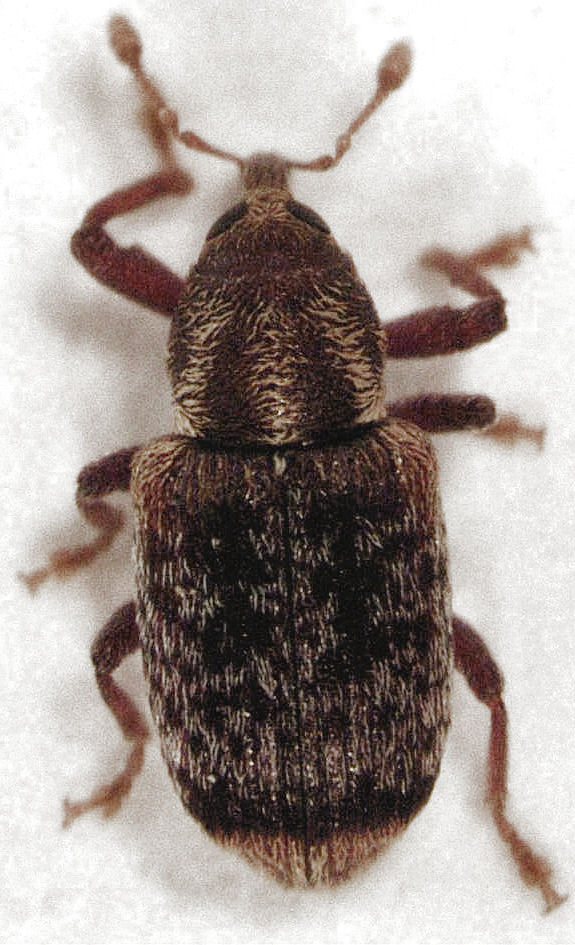
- Peristoreus flavitarsis

Scientific classification
- Kingdom: Animalia
- Phylum: Arthropoda
- Class: Insecta
- Order: Coleoptera
- Suborder: Polyphaga
- Infraorder: Cucujiformia
- Family: Curculionidae
- Genus: Peristoreus
- Species: P. flavitarsis

Binomial name
- Peristoreus flavitarsis (Broun, 1880)

= Peristoreus flavitarsis =

Species of beetle

Peristoreus flavitarsis is a species of true weevil. It is endemic to New Zealand. The larvae are leaf miners of Podocarpus totara. Similar leaf mines have also been found on Podocarpus acutifolius and Podocarpus cunninghamii.

P. flavitarsis was originally named Erirhinus flavitarsis by Broun in 1880. Then, in 1926, Marshall described a new genus called Dorytomodes, into which he provisionally transferred all species placed by Broun in Erirrhinus [=Erirhinus]. Dorytomodes was subsequently sunk as a synonym of Peristoreus by Edward S. ("Ted") Gourlay in 1950.

P. flavitarsis has been reported from North Island localities, including Parua (type locality) and Huia.
