= Cionopsis maculata =

Scientific classification
- Kingdom: Animalia
- Phylum: Arthropoda
- Class: Insecta
- Order: Coleoptera
- Suborder: Polyphaga
- Infraorder: Cucujiformia
- Family: Curculionidae
- Genus: Cionopsis
- Species: C. maculata

Binomial name
- Cionopsis maculata Burke, 1982

Species of beetle

Cionopsis maculata is a species of true weevil in the beetle family Curculionidae. It is found in North America.
