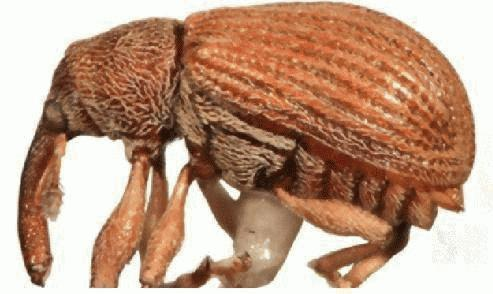

Scientific classification
- Kingdom: Animalia
- Phylum: Arthropoda
- Clade: Pancrustacea
- Class: Insecta
- Order: Coleoptera
- Suborder: Polyphaga
- Infraorder: Cucujiformia
- Family: Curculionidae
- Genus: Pseudanthonomus
- Species: P. helvolus

Binomial name
- Pseudanthonomus helvolus (Boheman, 1843)

Synonyms
- Pseudanthonomus hamamelidis Pierce, 1908; Pseudanthonomus incipiens Dietz, 1891; Pseudanthonomus relictus Dietz, 1891

= Pseudanthonomus helvolus =

Species of beetle

Pseudanthonomus helvolus is a species of true weevil in the beetle family Curculionidae. It is found in North America.
