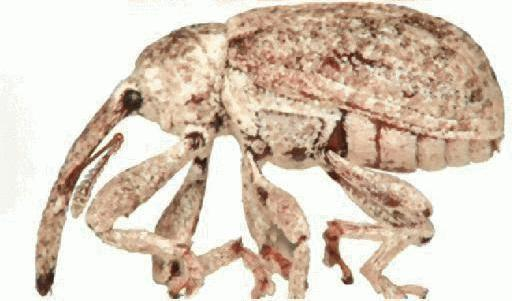

Scientific classification
- Domain: Eukaryota
- Kingdom: Animalia
- Phylum: Arthropoda
- Class: Insecta
- Order: Coleoptera
- Suborder: Polyphaga
- Infraorder: Cucujiformia
- Family: Curculionidae
- Genus: Narberdia
- Species: N. aridulus

Binomial name
- Narberdia aridulus Burke, 1976

= Narberdia aridulus =

Species of beetle

Narberdia aridulus is a species of true weevil in the beetle family Curculionidae. It is found in North America.
