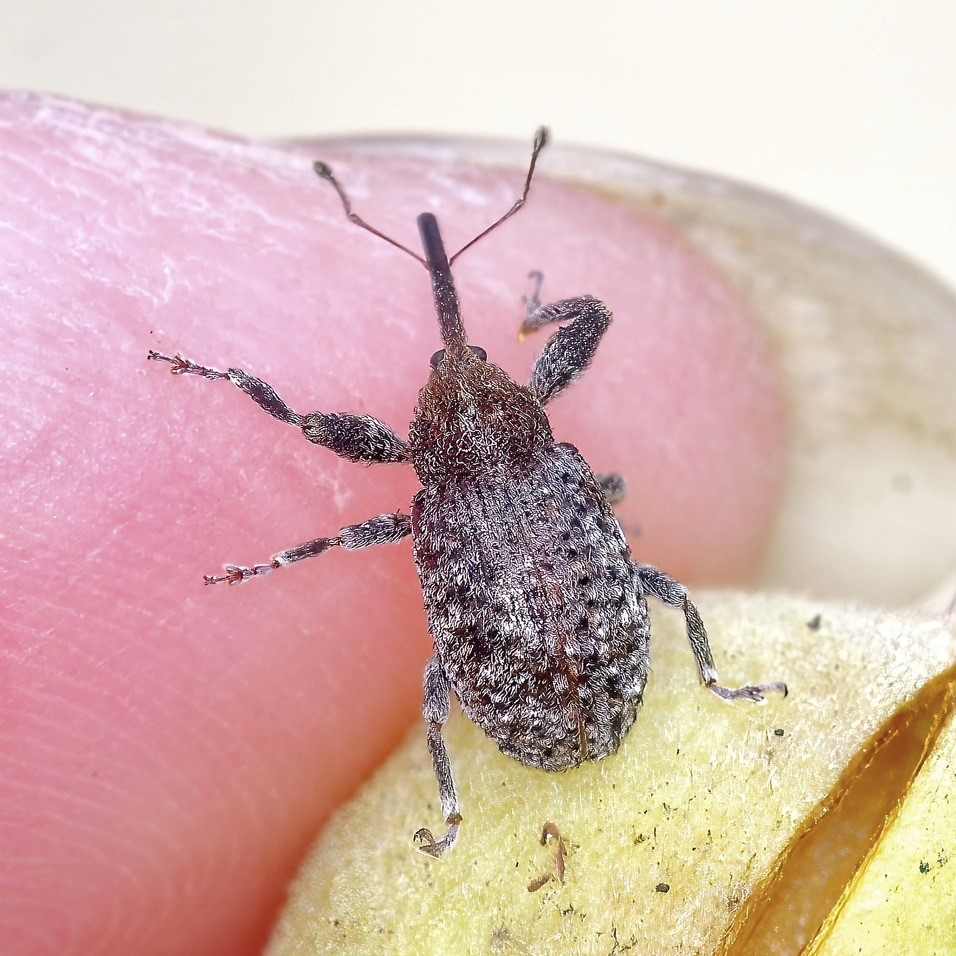

Scientific classification
- Kingdom: Animalia
- Phylum: Arthropoda
- Clade: Pancrustacea
- Class: Insecta
- Order: Coleoptera
- Suborder: Polyphaga
- Infraorder: Cucujiformia
- Superfamily: Curculionoidea
- Family: Curculionidae
- Genus: Coccotorus
- Species: C. pruniphilus

Binomial name
- Coccotorus pruniphilus Chittenden, 1925

= Coccotorus pruniphilus =

Species of beetle

Coccotorus pruniphilus is a species of true weevil in the beetle family Curculionidae. It is endemic to Texas in the United States and the larvae feed on the seeds of Prunus minutiflora.
