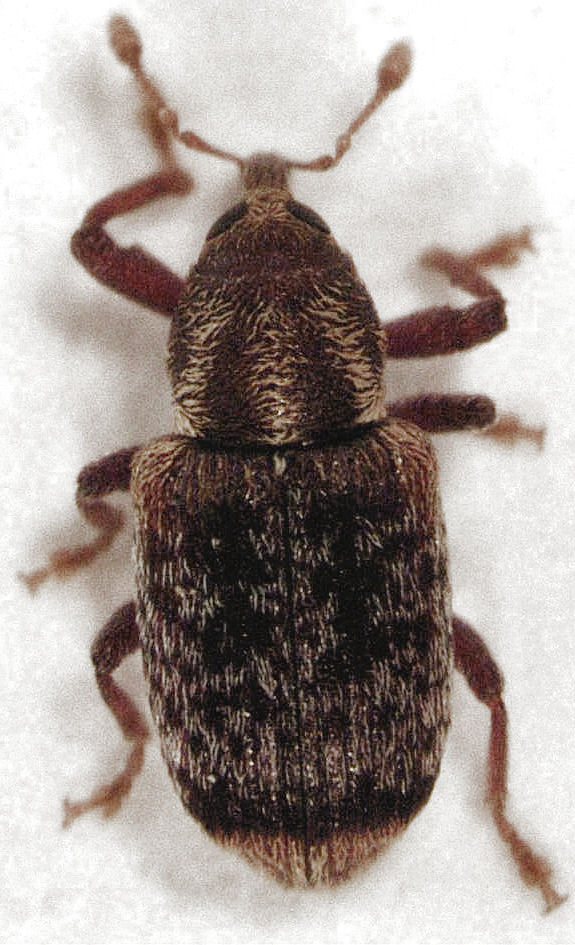
- Peristoreus flavitarsis (Broun, 1880)

Scientific classification
- Kingdom: Animalia
- Phylum: Arthropoda
- Clade: Pancrustacea
- Class: Insecta
- Order: Coleoptera
- Suborder: Polyphaga
- Infraorder: Cucujiformia
- Superfamily: Curculionoidea
- Family: Curculionidae
- Tribe: Storeini
- Genus: Peristoreus; Kirsch, 1877

Species
- See text.

= Peristoreus =

Genus of beetles

Peristoreus is a weevil genus native to New Zealand. This genus was first described in 1877 by Theodor Franz Wilhelm Kirsch.

== Species ==
Species contained within the genus of Peristoreus are:

- Peristoreus acalyptoides (Pascoe, 1876)
- Peristoreus acceptus (Broun, 1881)
- Peristoreus aciphyllae (Broun, 1886)
- Peristoreus aericomus (Broun, 1883)
- Peristoreus albisetosus (Broun, 1914)
- Peristoreus altivagans (Broun, 1921)
- Peristoreus anchoralis (Broun, 1881)
- Peristoreus anxius (Broun, 1893)
- Peristoreus australis (Broun, 1921)
- Peristoreus bicavus (Broun, 1886)
- Peristoreus castigatus (Broun, 1909)
- Peristoreus celmisiae (Broun, 1917)
- Peristoreus cheesemani (Broun, 1886)
- Peristoreus confusus (Broun, 1886)
- Peristoreus consonus (Broun, 1913)
- Peristoreus cordipennis (Broun, 1915)
- Peristoreus crucigerus (Broun, 1881)
- Peristoreus decussatus (Marshall, 1926)
- Peristoreus difformipes (Broun, 1886)
- Peristoreus dilucidus (Broun, 1921)
- Peristoreus discoideus (Broun, 1880)
- Peristoreus dolosus (Broun, 1881)
- Peristoreus durus (Broun, 1886)
- Peristoreus elegans (Sharp, 1883)
- Peristoreus eustictus (Broun, 1886)
- Peristoreus exilis (Broun, 1913)
- Peristoreus fascialis (Broun, 1881)
- Peristoreus femoralis (Broun, 1881)
- Peristoreus flavitarsis (Broun, 1880)
- Peristoreus floricola (Broun, 1914)
- Peristoreus fulvescens (Broun, 1914)
- Peristoreus fulvus (Broun, 1886)
- Peristoreus fuscipes (Broun, 1893)
- Peristoreus fusconotatus (Broun, 1880)
- Peristoreus fuscoventris (Broun, 1886)
- Peristoreus glottis (Pascoe, 1877)
- Peristoreus gracilirostris (Broun, 1881)
- Peristoreus grossus (Broun, 1893)
- Peristoreus innocens Kirsch, 1877
- Peristoreus insignis (Broun, 1909)
- Peristoreus insolitus (Broun, 1909)
- Peristoreus lateralis (Broun, 1881)
- Peristoreus leucocomus (Broun, 1921)
- Peristoreus limbatus (Pascoe, 1877)
- Peristoreus maorinus (Broun, 1913)
- Peristoreus melastictus (Broun, 1914)
- Peristoreus melastomus (Broun, 1886)
- Peristoreus methvenensis (Broun, 1915)
- Peristoreus nesobius (Broun, 1886)
- Peristoreus nocens (Broun, 1881)
- Peristoreus obscurus (Broun, 1921)
- Peristoreus ochraceus (Broun, 1881)
- Peristoreus oleariae (Broun, 1913)
- Peristoreus pardalis (Marshall, 1926)
- Peristoreus pectoralis (Broun, 1914)
- Peristoreus poecilus (Broun, 1921)
- Peristoreus rufirostris (Broun, 1880)
- Peristoreus sexmaculatus (Broun, 1881)
- Peristoreus spadiceus (Broun, 1909)
- Peristoreus stramineus (Broun, 1881)
- Peristoreus subconicollis (Broun, 1923)
- Peristoreus sudus (Broun, 1881)
- Peristoreus sylvaticus (Broun, 1914)
- Peristoreus terrestris (Broun, 1914)
- Peristoreus thomsoni (Broun, 1886)
- Peristoreus titahensis (Broun, 1913)
- Peristoreus trilobus (Pascoe, 1877)
- Peristoreus veronicae (Broun, 1886)
- Peristoreus viridipennis (Broun, 1880)
- Peristoreus vittatus (Broun, 1921)
- Peristoreus xenorhinus (Broun, 1886)
