= Pseudanthonomus tomentosulus =

Scientific classification
- Kingdom: Animalia
- Phylum: Arthropoda
- Clade: Pancrustacea
- Class: Insecta
- Order: Coleoptera
- Suborder: Polyphaga
- Infraorder: Cucujiformia
- Family: Curculionidae
- Genus: Pseudanthonomus
- Species: P. tomentosulus

Binomial name
- Pseudanthonomus tomentosulus Dietz, 1891

Synonyms
- Pseudanthonomus krameriae Pierce, 1908

Species of beetle

Pseudanthonomus tomentosulus is a species of true weevil in the beetle family Curculionidae. It is found in North America.
