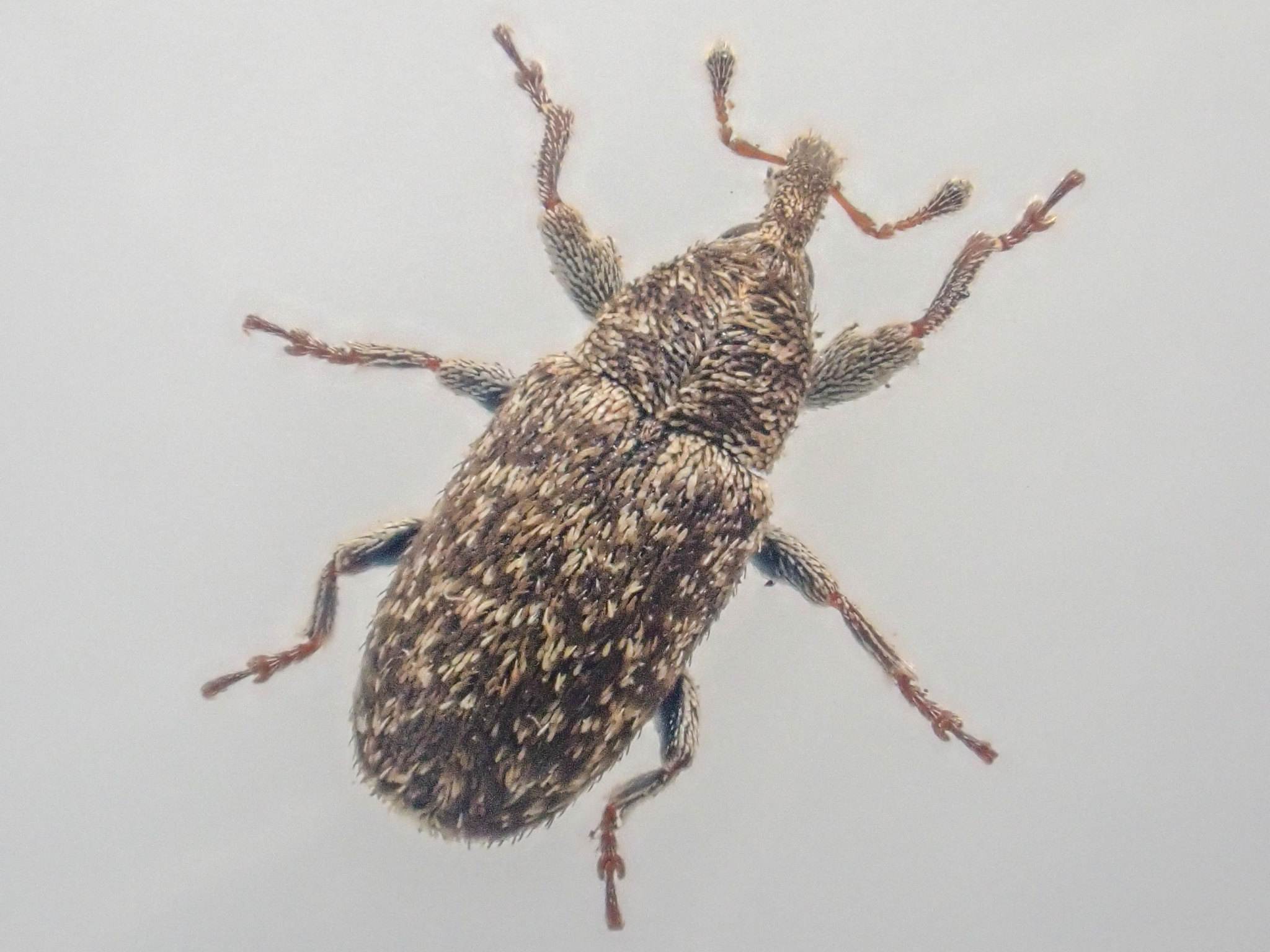
- Macrorhoptus hispidus, California

Scientific classification
- Domain: Eukaryota
- Kingdom: Animalia
- Phylum: Arthropoda
- Class: Insecta
- Order: Coleoptera
- Suborder: Polyphaga
- Infraorder: Cucujiformia
- Family: Curculionidae
- Subfamily: Curculioninae
- Genus: Macrorhoptus
- Species: M. hispidus

Binomial name
- Macrorhoptus hispidus Dietz, 1891

= Macrorhoptus hispidus =

Species of beetles

Macrorhoptus hispidus is a species of weevil in the beetle family Curculionidae. It is found in North America.
