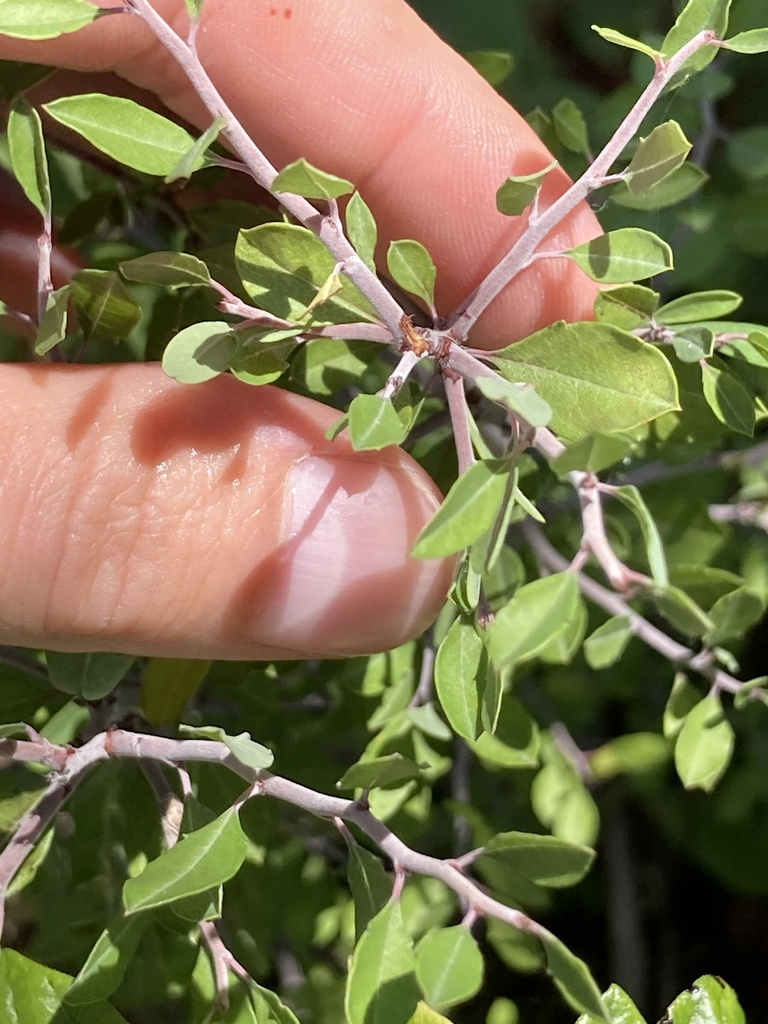
- Leaves and stems

Conservation status
- Near Threatened (IUCN 3.1)

- Vulnerable (NatureServe)

Scientific classification
- Kingdom: Plantae
- Clade: Embryophytes
- Clade: Tracheophytes
- Clade: Angiosperms
- Clade: Eudicots
- Clade: Rosids
- Order: Rosales
- Family: Rosaceae
- Genus: Prunus
- Subgenus: Prunus subg. Prunus
- Section: Prunus sect. Emplectocladus
- Species: P. minutiflora

Binomial name
- Prunus minutiflora Engelm. ex A. Gray

Synonyms
- Amygdalus minutiflora (Engelm.) W.Wight; Armeniaca minutiflora (Engelm. ex A.Gray) K.Koch; Emplectocladus minutiflorus (Engelm. ex A.Gray) Dayton; Cerasus minutiflora (Engelm. ex A. Gray) A. Gray

= Prunus minutiflora =

Species of shrub

Prunus minutiflora, commonly known as the Texas almond, is a North American species of shrub.

== Description ==
Texas almond is a dense thicket-forming deciduous shrub reaching a height of 0.9 metres (3 feet). The branches have a zigzag shape and are weakly thorny. The twigs have axillary end buds and are canescent.

The leaf blades are elliptic or obovate, measure 5–16 millimetres (1/4–3/4 in) × 3–8 millimetres (0–1/4 in), and have a cuneate base. The margins are usually entire but are sometimes irregularly serrated. The surfaces are glabrous. The petioles are 1–2 mm long. The leaves are sometimes fasciculate.

P. minutiflora is dioecious, having male and female flowers on separate plants, which is rare for Prunus. Blooms are formed singly at leaf buds. The hypanthium is externally glabrous, bell-shaped, and measures 2–3 mm. The glabrous sepals are spreading, triangular, have entire margins, and measure 0.7–1.5 mm. The white petals are obovate and 2–3.5 millimetres (1/16–1/8 inch) long. The ovaries are hairy. The pedicels are 0–2 mm in length and puberulent. Flowering occurs from February through March.

The fruit is a globose to ovoid drupe 9–12 millimetres (1/4–1/2 in) in diameter. Drupes are reddish brown and lightly covered in hairs. The mesocarps are leathery to dry and slightly splitting. The seed is an ovoid to subglobose stone. Fruiting occurs in May and June.

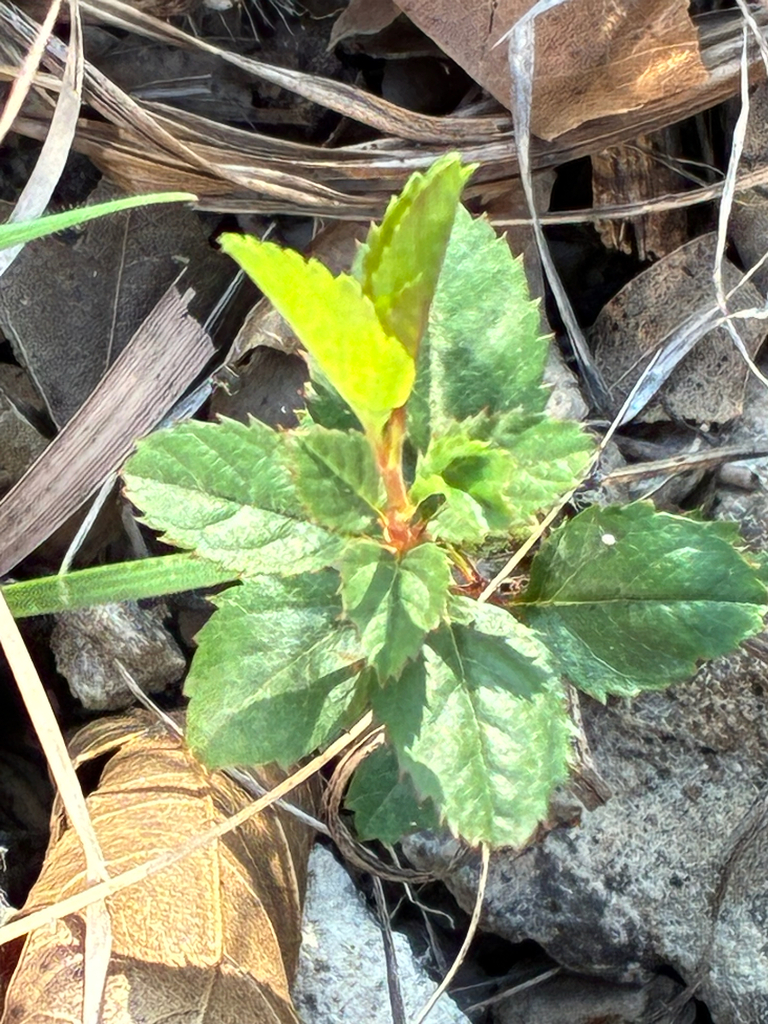
Seedling with serrated leaves

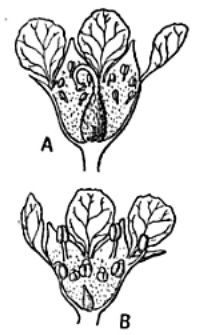
Female (A) and male (B) flowers

== Taxonomy ==
The species was described in the Boston Journal of Natural History in 1850 by George Engelmann and Asa Gray based on a holotype collected by Ferdinand Lindheimer at Comanche Spring in New Braunfels, Texas in 1846. 'Minutiflora' means "minute flower" and refers to the diminutive flowers of this species.

== Distribution and habitat ==
Texas almond is native to Texas in the United States and Chihuahua in northern Mexico. It is nearly endemic to the Edwards Plateau, with its range extending slightly into the adjacent Tamaulipan mezquital, Trans-Pecos, and chalk ridges of the Texas Blackland Prairies.

The species inhabits dry, open grasslands and shrublands generally in calcareous soils over limestone but sometimes in neutral, sandy soils above granite. It is found in rocky streambeds, uplands, hills, slopes, sandy brushy plains, canyons, on ledges, and in rock outcroppings.

== Ecology ==
Seeds are fed upon by the larvae of the weevil Coccotorus pruniphilus, while the leaves are believed to be a host plant for larvae of the moth Ursia furtiva.

== Conservation ==
P. minutiflora is considered Vulnerable by NatureServe and Near Threatened by the IUCN. Its threats are unknown but may include development, invasive species and herbivory by bagworm moths.

== Cultivation ==
Texas almond has value as an ornamental groundcover for dry rocky locations. It is noted for its high benefits to wildlife in wildlife gardens.
