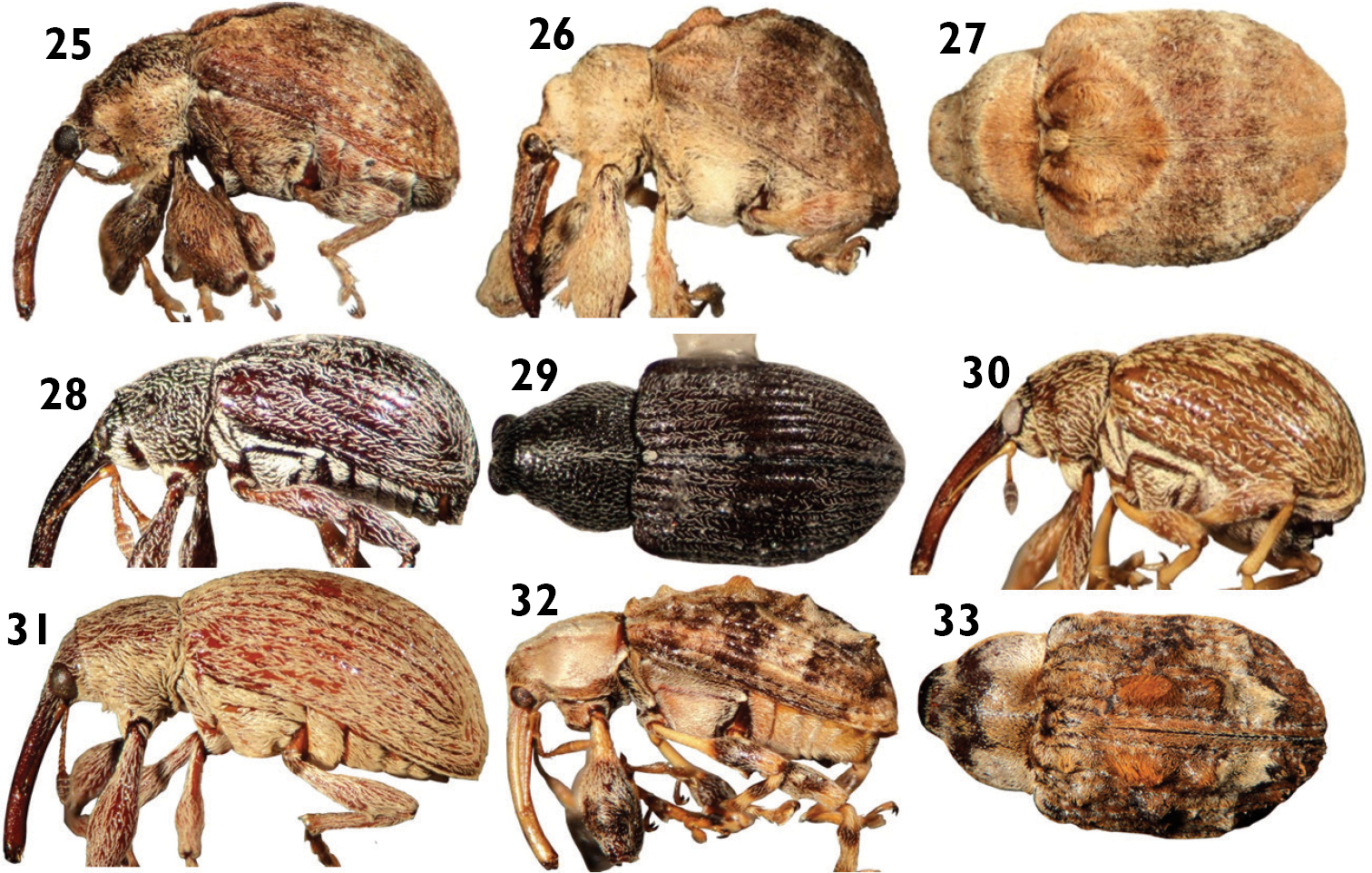
- Anthonomini species: 25 Achia serjaniae 26 and 27 Achia rhombifera 28 Anthonomus aeneolus 29 Anthonomus abdominalis 30 Anthonomus eugenii 31 Anthonomus grandis 32 and 33 Anthonomus flavirostris.

Scientific classification
- Kingdom: Animalia
- Phylum: Arthropoda
- Class: Insecta
- Order: Coleoptera
- Suborder: Polyphaga
- Infraorder: Cucujiformia
- Family: Curculionidae
- Subfamily: Curculioninae
- Tribe: Anthonomini

= Anthonomini =

Tribe of beetles

Anthonomini is a weevil tribe in the subfamily Curculioninae.

== Genera ==
- Acalyptops - Achia - Adelus - Anthonomopsis - Anthonomus - Apopnictus - Assuanensius - Atractomerus - Botanebius - Brachonyx - Brachyogmus - Bradybatus - Chelonychus - Cionesthes - Cionomimus - Cionopsis - Coccotorus - Cremastorhynchus - Dietzianus - Ephelops - Epimechus - Huaca - Lepidoops - Lonchophorellus - Loncophorus - Macrobrachonyx - Magdalinops - Melexeras - Nanops - Narberdia - Neomastix - Neosphinctocraerus - Omogonus - Onychoenemis - Parendoeopsis - Phacellopterus - Pseudanthonomus - Pseudopoophagus - Smicraulax - Sphincticraerus - Synnadophila - Telphasia
