= Pseudanthonomus rufulus =

Scientific classification
- Domain: Eukaryota
- Kingdom: Animalia
- Phylum: Arthropoda
- Class: Insecta
- Order: Coleoptera
- Suborder: Polyphaga
- Infraorder: Cucujiformia
- Family: Curculionidae
- Genus: Pseudanthonomus
- Species: P. rufulus

Binomial name
- Pseudanthonomus rufulus Dietz, 1891

Species of beetle

Pseudanthonomus rufulus is a species of true weevil in the beetle family Curculionidae. It is found in North America.
