= Coccotorus pumilae =

Scientific classification
- Kingdom: Animalia
- Phylum: Arthropoda
- Clade: Pancrustacea
- Class: Insecta
- Order: Coleoptera
- Suborder: Polyphaga
- Infraorder: Cucujiformia
- Family: Curculionidae
- Genus: Coccotorus
- Species: C. pumilae

Binomial name
- Coccotorus pumilae (Brown, 1966)

Synonyms
- Anthonomus major Brown, 1966

Species of beetle

Coccotorus pumilae is a species of true weevil in the beetle family Curculionidae. It is found in North America.
