= Macrorhoptus estriatus =

Scientific classification
- Kingdom: Animalia
- Phylum: Arthropoda
- Class: Insecta
- Order: Coleoptera
- Suborder: Polyphaga
- Infraorder: Cucujiformia
- Family: Curculionidae
- Subfamily: Curculioninae
- Genus: Macrorhoptus
- Species: M. estriatus

Binomial name
- Macrorhoptus estriatus LeConte, 1876

Species of beetles

Macrorhoptus estriatus is a species of weevil in the beetle family Curculionidae, found in the central United States.
