= Smicraulax arizonicus =

Scientific classification
- Kingdom: Animalia
- Phylum: Arthropoda
- Clade: Pancrustacea
- Class: Insecta
- Order: Coleoptera
- Suborder: Polyphaga
- Infraorder: Cucujiformia
- Family: Curculionidae
- Genus: Smicraulax
- Species: S. arizonicus

Binomial name
- Smicraulax arizonicus Sleeper, 1954

Species of beetle

Smicraulax arizonicus is a species of true weevil in the beetle family Curculionidae. It is found in North America.
