= Ursia =

Scientific classification
- Kingdom: Animalia
- Phylum: Arthropoda
- Clade: Pancrustacea
- Class: Insecta
- Order: Lepidoptera
- Superfamily: Noctuoidea
- Family: Notodontidae
- Subfamily: Heterocampinae
- Genus: Ursia; Barnes & McDunnough, 1911

Genus of moths

Ursia is a genus of moths of the family Notodontidae, the prominents. The genus was erected by William Barnes and James Halliday McDunnough in 1911.

== Species ==
- Ursia furtiva Blanchard, 1971
- Ursia noctuiformis Barnes & McDunnough, 1911
