= Epimechus curvipes =

Scientific classification
- Domain: Eukaryota
- Kingdom: Animalia
- Phylum: Arthropoda
- Class: Insecta
- Order: Coleoptera
- Suborder: Polyphaga
- Infraorder: Cucujiformia
- Family: Curculionidae
- Genus: Epimechus
- Species: E. curvipes

Binomial name
- Epimechus curvipes Dietz, 1891

Species of beetle

Epimechus curvipes is a species of true weevil in the beetle family Curculionidae. It is found in North America.
