= Piazorhinus scutellaris =

Scientific classification
- Domain: Eukaryota
- Kingdom: Animalia
- Phylum: Arthropoda
- Class: Insecta
- Order: Coleoptera
- Suborder: Polyphaga
- Infraorder: Cucujiformia
- Family: Curculionidae
- Genus: Piazorhinus
- Species: P. scutellaris

Binomial name
- Piazorhinus scutellaris (Say, 1826)

Species of beetle

Piazorhinus scutellaris is a species of true weevil in the beetle family Curculionidae. It is found in North America.
