= Coccotorus scutellaris =

Scientific classification
- Domain: Eukaryota
- Kingdom: Animalia
- Phylum: Arthropoda
- Class: Insecta
- Order: Coleoptera
- Suborder: Polyphaga
- Infraorder: Cucujiformia
- Family: Curculionidae
- Genus: Coccotorus
- Species: C. scutellaris

Binomial name
- Coccotorus scutellaris (LeConte, 1858)

Synonyms
- Anthonomus prunicida Walsh, 1863

Species of beetle

Coccotorus scutellaris, the plum gouger, is a species of true weevil in the beetle family Curculionidae. It is found in North America.
