= Ursia furtiva =

Conservation status
- Critically Imperiled (NatureServe)

Scientific classification
- Kingdom: Animalia
- Phylum: Arthropoda
- Clade: Pancrustacea
- Class: Insecta
- Order: Lepidoptera
- Superfamily: Noctuoidea
- Family: Notodontidae
- Genus: Ursia
- Species: U. furtiva

Binomial name
- Ursia furtiva A. Blanchard, 1971

Species of moth

Ursia furtiva is a species of moth in the family Notodontidae (the prominents) that is endemic to Texas in the United States. It was first described by André Blanchard in 1971. Its larvae feed on Prunus havardii and most likely P. minutiflora.

The MONA or Hodges number for Ursia furtiva is 8003.
