= Huaca apian =

Scientific classification
- Kingdom: Animalia
- Phylum: Arthropoda
- Clade: Pancrustacea
- Class: Insecta
- Order: Coleoptera
- Suborder: Polyphaga
- Infraorder: Cucujiformia
- Family: Curculionidae
- Genus: Huaca
- Species: H. apian

Binomial name
- Huaca apian Clark, 1993

Species of beetle

Huaca apian is a species of true weevil in the beetle family Curculionidae. It is found in North America.
