= Chelonychus longipes =

Scientific classification
- Kingdom: Animalia
- Phylum: Arthropoda
- Class: Insecta
- Order: Coleoptera
- Suborder: Polyphaga
- Infraorder: Cucujiformia
- Family: Curculionidae
- Genus: Chelonychus
- Species: C. longipes

Binomial name
- Chelonychus longipes Dietz, 1891

Species of beetle

Chelonychus longipes is a species of true weevil in the beetle family Curculionidae. It is found in North America.
