= Pseudanthonomus crataegi =

Scientific classification
- Kingdom: Animalia
- Phylum: Arthropoda
- Clade: Pancrustacea
- Class: Insecta
- Order: Coleoptera
- Suborder: Polyphaga
- Infraorder: Cucujiformia
- Family: Curculionidae
- Genus: Pseudanthonomus
- Species: P. crataegi

Binomial name
- Pseudanthonomus crataegi (Walsh, 1867)

Synonyms
- Pseudanthonomus brunneus Dietz, 1891; Pseudanthonomus longulus Dietz, 1891; Pseudanthonomus parvulus Dietz, 1891; Pseudanthonomus puncticollis Blatchley, 1916

Species of beetle

Pseudanthonomus crataegi is a species of true weevil in the beetle family Curculionidae. It is found in North America.
