= Piazorhinus tuberculatus =

Scientific classification
- Domain: Eukaryota
- Kingdom: Animalia
- Phylum: Arthropoda
- Class: Insecta
- Order: Coleoptera
- Suborder: Polyphaga
- Infraorder: Cucujiformia
- Family: Curculionidae
- Genus: Piazorhinus
- Species: P. tuberculatus

Binomial name
- Piazorhinus tuberculatus Blatchley, 1916

Species of beetle

Piazorhinus tuberculatus is a species of true weevil in the beetle family Curculionidae. It is found in North America.
