= Dietzianus pygmaeus =

Scientific classification
- Kingdom: Animalia
- Phylum: Arthropoda
- Clade: Pancrustacea
- Class: Insecta
- Order: Coleoptera
- Suborder: Polyphaga
- Infraorder: Cucujiformia
- Family: Curculionidae
- Genus: Dietzianus
- Species: D. pygmaeus

Binomial name
- Dietzianus pygmaeus (Dietz, 1891)

Species of beetle

Dietzianus pygmaeus is a species of true weevil in the beetle family Curculionidae. It is found in North America.
