= Piazorhinus pictus =

Scientific classification
- Kingdom: Animalia
- Phylum: Arthropoda
- Class: Insecta
- Order: Coleoptera
- Suborder: Polyphaga
- Infraorder: Cucujiformia
- Family: Curculionidae
- Genus: Piazorhinus
- Species: P. pictus

Binomial name
- Piazorhinus pictus LeConte, 1928

Species of beetle

Piazorhinus pictus is a species of true weevil in the beetle family Curculionidae. It is found in South America.
