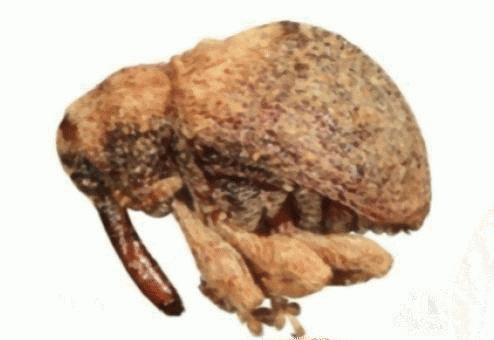

Scientific classification
- Kingdom: Animalia
- Phylum: Arthropoda
- Clade: Pancrustacea
- Class: Insecta
- Order: Coleoptera
- Suborder: Polyphaga
- Infraorder: Cucujiformia
- Family: Curculionidae
- Genus: Cionomimus
- Species: C. insolens

Binomial name
- Cionomimus insolens (Dietz, 1891)

= Cionomimus insolens =

Species of beetle

Cionomimus insolens is a species of true weevil in the beetle family Curculionidae. It is found in North America.
