= Ursia noctuiformis =

Scientific classification
- Kingdom: Animalia
- Phylum: Arthropoda
- Clade: Pancrustacea
- Class: Insecta
- Order: Lepidoptera
- Superfamily: Noctuoidea
- Family: Notodontidae
- Genus: Ursia
- Species: U. noctuiformis

Binomial name
- Ursia noctuiformis Barnes & McDunnough, 1911

Species of moth

Ursia noctuiformis is a species of moth in the family Notodontidae (the prominents). It was first described by William Barnes and James Halliday McDunnough in 1911 and it is found in North America.

The MONA or Hodges number for Ursia noctuiformis is 8002.
