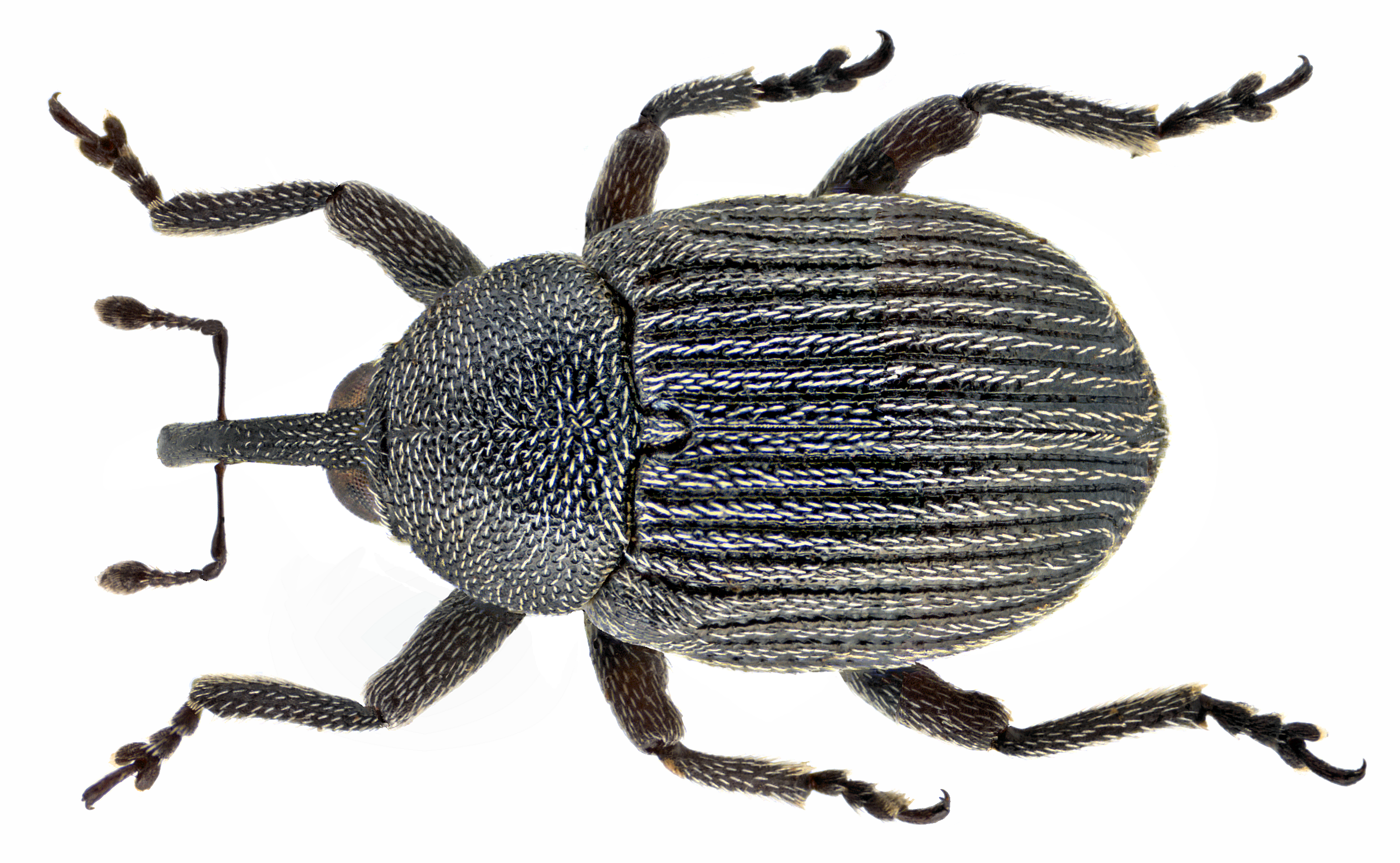
- Miarus campanulae 2,8 mm

Scientific classification
- Kingdom: Animalia
- Phylum: Arthropoda
- Class: Insecta
- Order: Coleoptera
- Suborder: Polyphaga
- Infraorder: Cucujiformia
- Family: Curculionidae
- Genus: Miarus
- Species: M. campanulae

Binomial name
- Miarus campanulae (Linnaeus, 1767)

= Miarus campanulae =

Species of beetle

Miarus campanulae is a species of weevil native to Europe.
