= Anthonomopsis =

Scientific classification
- Domain: Eukaryota
- Kingdom: Animalia
- Phylum: Arthropoda
- Class: Insecta
- Order: Coleoptera
- Suborder: Polyphaga
- Infraorder: Cucujiformia
- Family: Curculionidae
- Tribe: Anthonomini
- Genus: Anthonomopsis; Dietz, 1891

Genus of beetles

Anthonomopsis is a genus of true weevils in the beetle family Curculionidae. There is at least one described species in Anthonomopsis, A. mixta.
