= Coccotorus =

Scientific classification
- Domain: Eukaryota
- Kingdom: Animalia
- Phylum: Arthropoda
- Class: Insecta
- Order: Coleoptera
- Suborder: Polyphaga
- Infraorder: Cucujiformia
- Family: Curculionidae
- Tribe: Anthonomini
- Genus: Coccotorus; LeConte, 1876

Genus of beetles

Coccotorus is a genus of true weevils in the beetle family Curculionidae. There are about six described species in Coccotorus.

== Species ==
These six species belong to the genus Coccotorus:

- Coccotorus chaoi Chen, 1993^{c}
- Coccotorus hirsutus Bruner, 1888^{i g}
- Coccotorus pruniphilus Chittenden, 1925^{i c b}
- Coccotorus pumilae (Brown, 1966)^{i b}
- Coccotorus requiescens Scudder, 1893^{c}
- Coccotorus scutellaris (LeConte, 1858)^{i b} (plum gouger)

Data sources: i = ITIS, c = Catalogue of Life, g = GBIF, b = Bugguide.net
