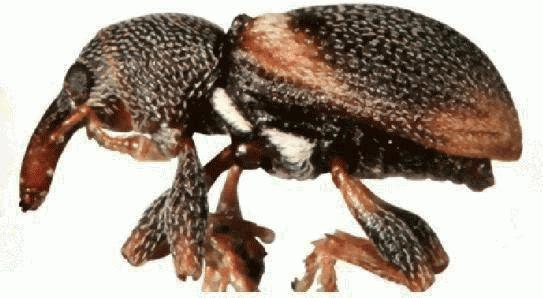
- Smicraulax tuberculatus

Scientific classification
- Domain: Eukaryota
- Kingdom: Animalia
- Phylum: Arthropoda
- Class: Insecta
- Order: Coleoptera
- Suborder: Polyphaga
- Infraorder: Cucujiformia
- Family: Curculionidae
- Tribe: Anthonomini
- Genus: Smicraulax; Pierce, 1908

= Smicraulax =

Genus of beetles

Smicraulax is a genus of true weevils in the beetle family Curculionidae. There are about six described species in Smicraulax.

== Species ==
These six species belong to the genus Smicraulax:

- Smicraulax arizonicus Sleeper, 1954^{i c b}
- Smicraulax ephippiatus Anderson, 1997^{c}
- Smicraulax nigrinus Anderson, 1997^{c}
- Smicraulax otidocephaloides Anderson, 1997^{c}
- Smicraulax piercei Burke & Cross, 1975^{c}
- Smicraulax tuberculatus Pierce, 1908^{i c}

Data sources: i = ITIS, c = Catalogue of Life, g = GBIF, b = Bugguide.net
