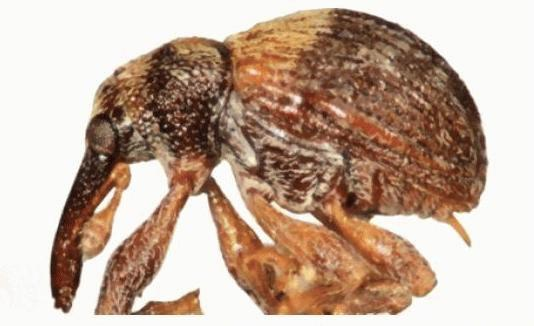
- Cionomimus championi

Scientific classification
- Domain: Eukaryota
- Kingdom: Animalia
- Phylum: Arthropoda
- Class: Insecta
- Order: Coleoptera
- Suborder: Polyphaga
- Infraorder: Cucujiformia
- Family: Curculionidae
- Tribe: Anthonomini
- Genus: Cionomimus; Marshall, 1939

= Cionomimus =

Genus of beetles

Cionomimus is a genus of true weevils in the beetle family Curculionidae. There are about 10 described species in Cionomimus. Adults are associated with Phoradendron plants, feeding on their reproductive organs.

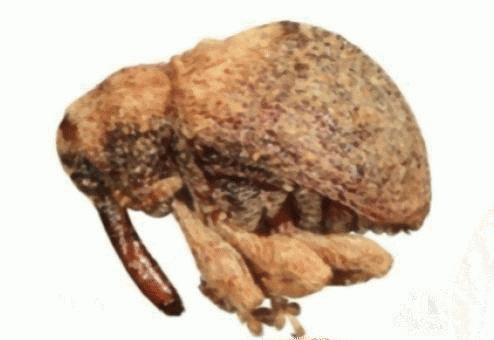
Cionomimus insolens

== Species ==
These 10 species belong to the genus Cionomimus:

- Cionomimus bimaculatus Anderson, 1997^{c}
- Cionomimus burkei Anderson, 1994^{c}
- Cionomimus championi Burke, 1981^{c}
- Cionomimus clarki Anderson, 1994^{c}
- Cionomimus dietzi Burke, 1981^{i c}
- Cionomimus grossus Anderson, 1994^{c}
- Cionomimus hansoni Anderson, 1997^{c}
- Cionomimus insolens (Dietz, 1891)^{i b}
- Cionomimus obrieni Anderson, 1994^{c}
- Cionomimus woodi Anderson, 1994^{c}

Data sources: i = ITIS, c = Catalogue of Life, g = GBIF, b = Bugguide.net
