= Wittmerius =

Scientific classification
- Domain: Eukaryota
- Kingdom: Animalia
- Phylum: Arthropoda
- Class: Insecta
- Order: Coleoptera
- Suborder: Polyphaga
- Infraorder: Cucujiformia
- Family: Curculionidae
- Genus: Wittmerius; Kuschel, 1952

Genus of beetles

Wittmerius is a genus of beetles belonging to the family Curculionidae.

Its native range is Southern South America.

== Species ==
Species:

- Wittmerius longirostris Kuschel, 1952
