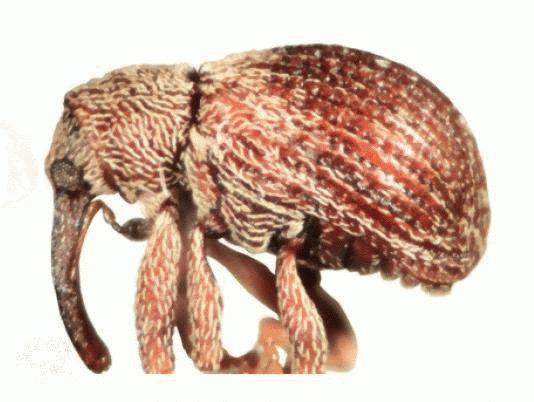
- Huaca mayu

Scientific classification
- Domain: Eukaryota
- Kingdom: Animalia
- Phylum: Arthropoda
- Class: Insecta
- Order: Coleoptera
- Suborder: Polyphaga
- Infraorder: Cucujiformia
- Family: Curculionidae
- Tribe: Anthonomini
- Genus: Huaca; Clark, 1993

= Huaca (beetle) =

Genus of beetles

Huaca is a genus of true weevils in the family of beetles known as Curculionidae. There are at least 20 described species in Huaca.

== Species ==
These 26 species belong to the genus Huaca:

- Huaca apian Clark, 1993^{i c b}
- Huaca ayacho Clark, 1993^{c}
- Huaca cajana Clark, 1993^{c}
- Huaca capi Clark, 1993^{c}
- Huaca cauas Clark, 1993^{c}
- Huaca cicui Clark, 1993^{c}
- Huaca cinca Clark, 1993^{c}
- Huaca collana Clark, 1993^{c}
- Huaca cuipan Clark, 1993^{c}
- Huaca cumpi Clark, 1993^{c}
- Huaca curvicrus Clark, 1993^{c}
- Huaca guayra Clark, 1993^{i c b}
- Huaca matoro Clark, 1993^{c}
- Huaca mayu Clark, 1993^{c}
- Huaca mudca Clark, 1993^{c}
- Huaca pacha Clark, 1993^{c}
- Huaca payan Clark, 1993^{c}
- Huaca picas Clark, 1993^{c}
- Huaca puquiu Clark, 1993^{c}
- Huaca quilca Clark, 1993^{c}
- Huaca quillo Clark, 1993^{c}
- Huaca quisco Clark, 1993^{c}
- Huaca sucanca Clark, 1993^{c}
- Huaca turuca Clark, 1993^{c}
- Huaca usno Clark, 1993^{c}
- Huaca uxi Clark, 1993^{c}

Data sources: i = ITIS, c = Catalogue of Life, g = GBIF, b = Bugguide.net
