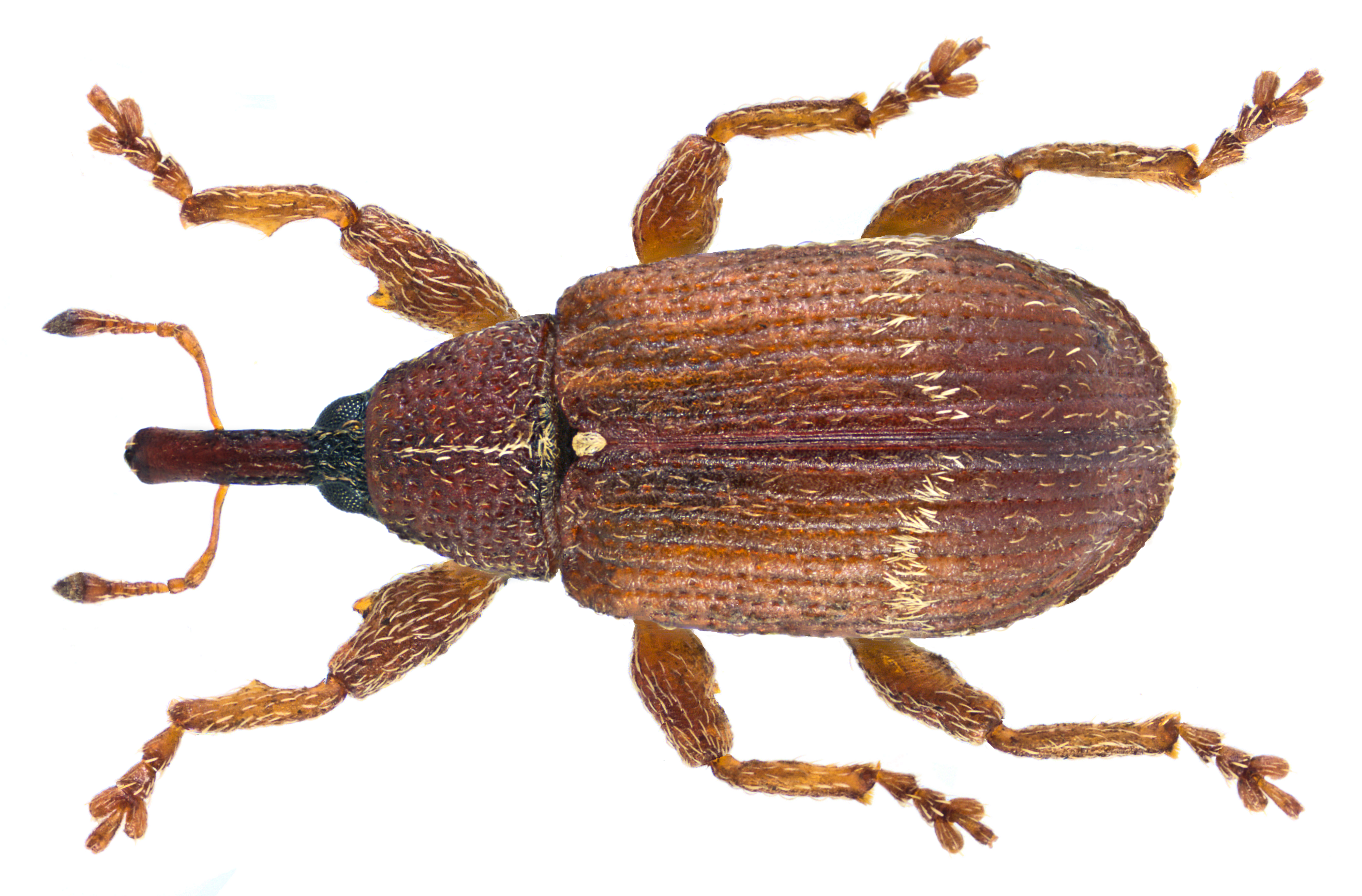
- Bradybatus fallax

Scientific classification
- Domain: Eukaryota
- Kingdom: Animalia
- Phylum: Arthropoda
- Class: Insecta
- Order: Coleoptera
- Suborder: Polyphaga
- Infraorder: Cucujiformia
- Family: Curculionidae
- Tribe: Anthonomini
- Genus: Bradybatus; Germar, 1824

= Bradybatus =

Genus of beetles

Bradybatus is a genus of beetles belonging to the family Curculionidae. The species of this genus are found in Europe and Japan.

== Species ==
The following species are recognised in the genus Bradybatus:

- Bradybatus abeillei Desbrochers, 1888
- Bradybatus aceris L.A.A.Chevrolat, 1866
- Bradybatus apicalis Pic & M., 1902
- Bradybatus arbeillei J.Desbrochers, 1888
- Bradybatus armiger T.Broun, 1893
- Bradybatus bituberculatus Cristofori & Jan, 1832
- Bradybatus carbonarius E.Reitter, 1884
- Bradybatus creutzeri Porta, 1932
- Bradybatus delagrangei J.Desbrochers, 1895
- Bradybatus duplicatus E.Reitter, 1898
- Bradybatus elongatulus Porta, 1932
- Bradybatus elongatus Boheman, 1835
- Bradybatus fallax Gerstaecker
- Bradybatus graciliformis Voss, 1960
- Bradybatus grandoides Dieckmann, 1968
- Bradybatus inermis Penecke, 1926
- Bradybatus kellneri Bach, 1854
- Bradybatus limbatus W.Roelofs, 1875
- Bradybatus minor Ter-Minasian, 1979
- Bradybatus nigripes E.Reitter, 1898
- Bradybatus ornatoides E.Reitter, 1898
- Bradybatus persicus Dieckmann, 1982
- Bradybatus robustirostris J.Desbrochers, 1868
- Bradybatus rufipennis E.Reitter, 1898
- Bradybatus seriesetosus Petri, 1912
- Bradybatus sharpi H.Tournier, 1873
- Bradybatus subfasciatus Gerstaecker
- Bradybatus tomentosus J.Desbrochers, 1892
- Bradybatus turkmenicus Ter-Minasian, 1979
- Bradybatus vaulogeri L.Bedel, 1905
