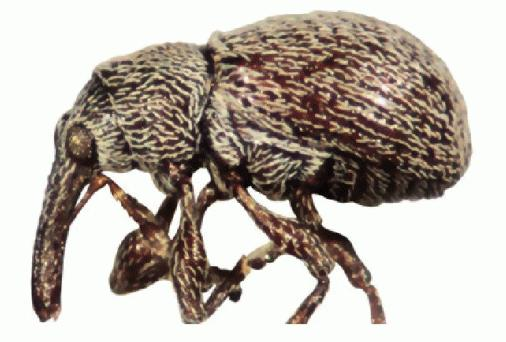

Scientific classification
- Kingdom: Animalia
- Phylum: Arthropoda
- Class: Insecta
- Order: Coleoptera
- Suborder: Polyphaga
- Infraorder: Cucujiformia
- Family: Curculionidae
- Tribe: Anthonomini
- Genus: Neomastix; Dietz, 1891

Type species
- Neomastix solidaginus Dietz, 1891

Species
- Neomastix cardinis Clark, 1993; Neomastix concolor Champion, G.C., 1903; Neomastix idolum Clark, 1993; Neomastix materia Clark, 1993; Neomastix metaphora Clark, 1993; Neomastix numerus Clark, 1993; Neomastix punctatulus Dietz, 1891; Neomastix setulosus Champion, G.C., 1903; Neomastix solidaginis Dietz, 1891; Neomastix spatium Clark, 1993; Neomastix tempus Clark, 1993; Neomastix veritas Clark, 1993

= Neomastix =

Genus of beetles

Neomastix is a genus of true weevils in the family of beetles known as Curculionidae. It is found in the Nearctic realm. The type species is N. solidaginus.
