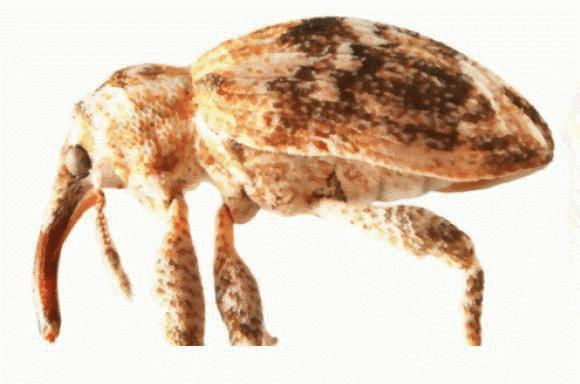
- Brachyogmus ornatus

Scientific classification
- Domain: Eukaryota
- Kingdom: Animalia
- Phylum: Arthropoda
- Class: Insecta
- Order: Coleoptera
- Suborder: Polyphaga
- Infraorder: Cucujiformia
- Family: Curculionidae
- Tribe: Anthonomini
- Genus: Brachyogmus; Linell, 1897

= Brachyogmus =

Genus of beetles

Brachyogmus is a genus of true weevils in the beetle family Curculionidae. There is at least one described species in Brachyogmus, B. ornatus.
