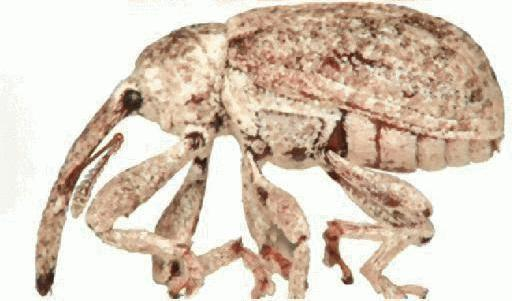
- Narberdia aridulus

Scientific classification
- Kingdom: Animalia
- Phylum: Arthropoda
- Class: Insecta
- Order: Coleoptera
- Suborder: Polyphaga
- Infraorder: Cucujiformia
- Family: Curculionidae
- Tribe: Anthonomini
- Genus: Narberdia; Burke, 1976

= Narberdia =

Genus of beetles

Narberdia is a genus of true weevils in the beetle family Curculionidae. There are at least four described species in Narberdia.

== Species ==
These four species belong to the genus Narberdia:

- Narberdia aridulus Burke, 1976^{i c b}
- Narberdia cervantae Soto-Hernandez^{g}
- Narberdia dugesi Soto-Hernandez^{g}
- Narberdia sarukhani Soto-Hernandez^{g}

Data sources: i = ITIS, c = Catalogue of Life, g = GBIF, b = Bugguide.net
