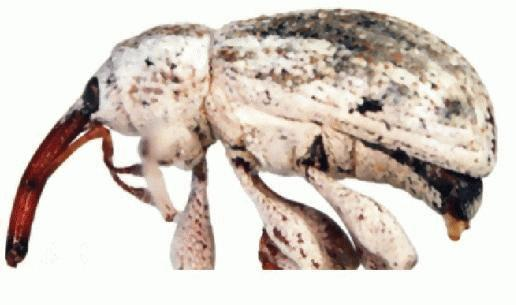
- Epimechus flavirostris

Scientific classification
- Domain: Eukaryota
- Kingdom: Animalia
- Phylum: Arthropoda
- Class: Insecta
- Order: Coleoptera
- Suborder: Polyphaga
- Infraorder: Cucujiformia
- Family: Curculionidae
- Tribe: Anthonomini
- Genus: Epimechus; Dietz, 1891

= Epimechus =

Genus of beetles

Epimechus is a genus of true weevils in the beetle family Curculionidae. There are more than 20 described species in Epimechus.

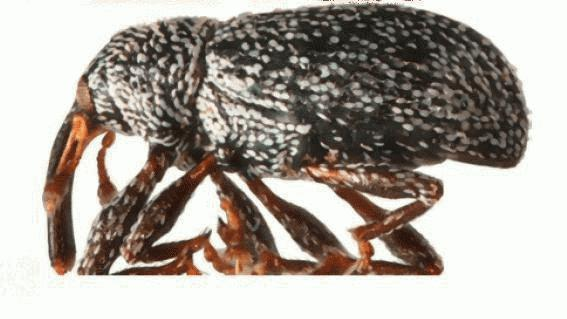
Epimechus hesperius

== Species ==
These 21 species belong to the genus Epimechus:

- Epimechus adspersus Dietz, 1891
- Epimechus aemulus Fall, 1901
- Epimechus alutaceus Hatch, 1971
- Epimechus arenicolor Fall, 1901
- Epimechus canoides Fall, 1913
- Epimechus combustus Clark & Burke, 2001
- Epimechus curvipes Dietz, 1891
- Epimechus flavirostris Fall, 1928
- Epimechus gracilis Fall, 1913
- Epimechus hesperius Clark & Burke, 2001
- Epimechus mimicus Dietz, 1891
- Epimechus mobilis Fall, 1913
- Epimechus modicus Fall, 1913
- Epimechus molina Clark & Burke, 2001
- Epimechus nanulus Fall, 1907
- Epimechus nevadicus Dietz, 1891
- Epimechus nivosus LeConte, J.L., 1876
- Epimechus signum Clark & Burke, 2001
- Epimechus soriculus Dietz, 1891
- Epimechus stragulus Fall, 1907
- Epimechus vinosus Blatchley & Leng, 1916
