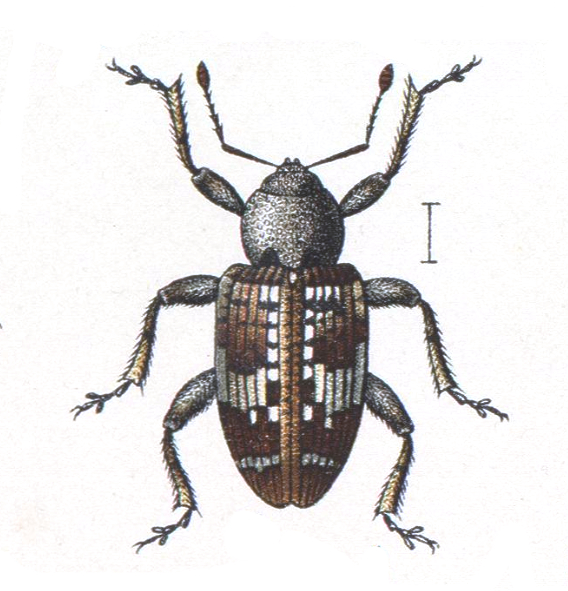
- Acentrus histrio

Scientific classification
- Kingdom: Animalia
- Phylum: Arthropoda
- Clade: Pancrustacea
- Class: Insecta
- Order: Coleoptera
- Suborder: Polyphaga
- Infraorder: Cucujiformia
- Family: Curculionidae
- Subfamily: Curculioninae
- Genus: Acentrus; Schönherr, 1837

= Acentrus =

Genus of beetles

Acentrus is a genus of true weevils in the family of beetles known as Curculionidae. There is at least one described species in Acentrus, A. histrio. They can be found in Italy, especially in seaside areas.
