= Dietzianus =

Scientific classification
- Domain: Eukaryota
- Kingdom: Animalia
- Phylum: Arthropoda
- Class: Insecta
- Order: Coleoptera
- Suborder: Polyphaga
- Infraorder: Cucujiformia
- Family: Curculionidae
- Tribe: Anthonomini
- Genus: Dietzianus; Sleeper, 1953

Genus of beetles

Dietzianus is a genus of true weevils in the beetle family Curculionidae. There are at least two described species in Dietzianus.

== Species ==
These two species belong to the genus Dietzianus:

- Dietzianus liliputanus (Dietz, 1891)^{i}
- Dietzianus pygmaeus (Dietz, 1891)^{i b}

Data sources: i = ITIS, c = Catalogue of Life, g = GBIF, b = Bugguide.net
