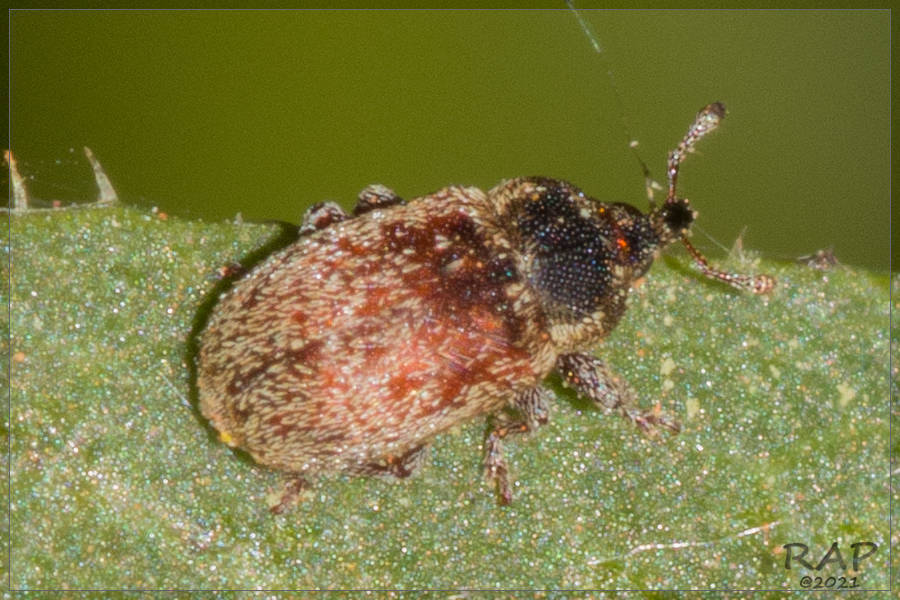
- Macrorhoptus, Argentina

Scientific classification
- Kingdom: Animalia
- Phylum: Arthropoda
- Class: Insecta
- Order: Coleoptera
- Suborder: Polyphaga
- Infraorder: Cucujiformia
- Family: Curculionidae
- Subfamily: Curculioninae
- Genus: Macrorhoptus; LeConte, 1876

= Macrorhoptus =

Genus of beetles

Macrorhoptus is a genus of weevils in the beetle family Curculionidae. There are about nine described species in Macrorhoptus, found in the Americas.

== Species ==
These nine species belong to the genus Macrorhoptus:

- Macrorhoptus australis Wibmer & O'Brien, 1986
- Macrorhoptus estriatus LeConte, 1876
- Macrorhoptus griseus Sleeper, 1957
- Macrorhoptus hispidus Dietz, 1891
- Macrorhoptus intutus Scudder, 1893
- Macrorhoptus mexicanus Champion, G.C., 1903
- Macrorhoptus niger Hatch, 1972
- Macrorhoptus sidalceae Sleeper, 1957
- Macrorhoptus sphaeralciae Pierce, W.D., 1908
