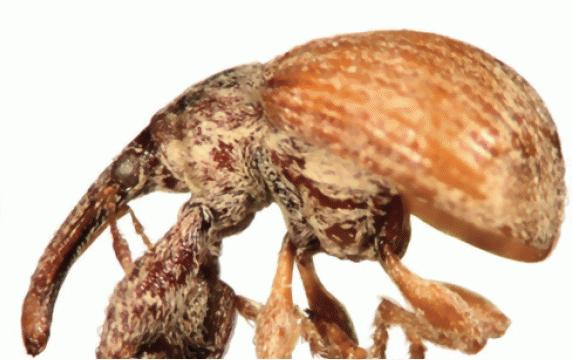
- Cionopsis crispula

Scientific classification
- Domain: Eukaryota
- Kingdom: Animalia
- Phylum: Arthropoda
- Class: Insecta
- Order: Coleoptera
- Suborder: Polyphaga
- Infraorder: Cucujiformia
- Family: Curculionidae
- Tribe: Anthonomini
- Genus: Cionopsis; Champion, 1903

= Cionopsis =

Genus of beetles

Cionopsis is a genus of true weevils in the beetle family Curculionidae. There are about five described species in Cionopsis.

== Species ==
These five species belong to the genus Cionopsis:

- Cionopsis crispula Burke, 1981^{c}
- Cionopsis echinata Burke, 1981^{c}
- Cionopsis lineola Burke, 1982^{i c b}
- Cionopsis maculata Burke, 1982^{i c b}
- Cionopsis palliatus Champion, G.C., 1903^{c}

Data sources: i = ITIS, c = Catalogue of Life, g = GBIF, b = Bugguide.net
