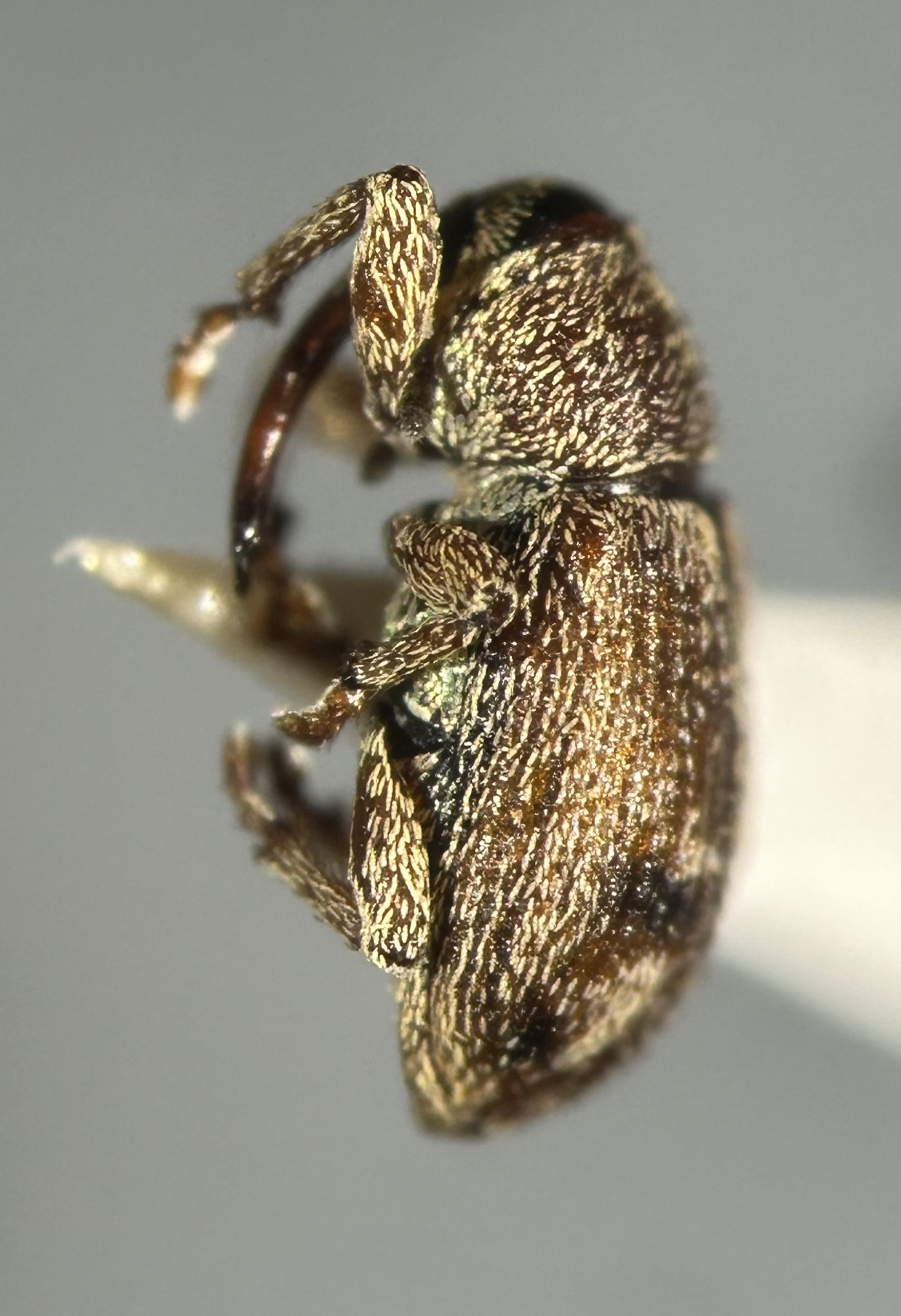
- Misophrice sp.

Scientific classification
- Domain: Eukaryota
- Kingdom: Animalia
- Phylum: Arthropoda
- Class: Insecta
- Order: Coleoptera
- Suborder: Polyphaga
- Infraorder: Cucujiformia
- Family: Curculionidae
- Tribe: Storeini
- Genus: Misophrice; Pascoe, 1872

= Misophrice =

Genus of beetles

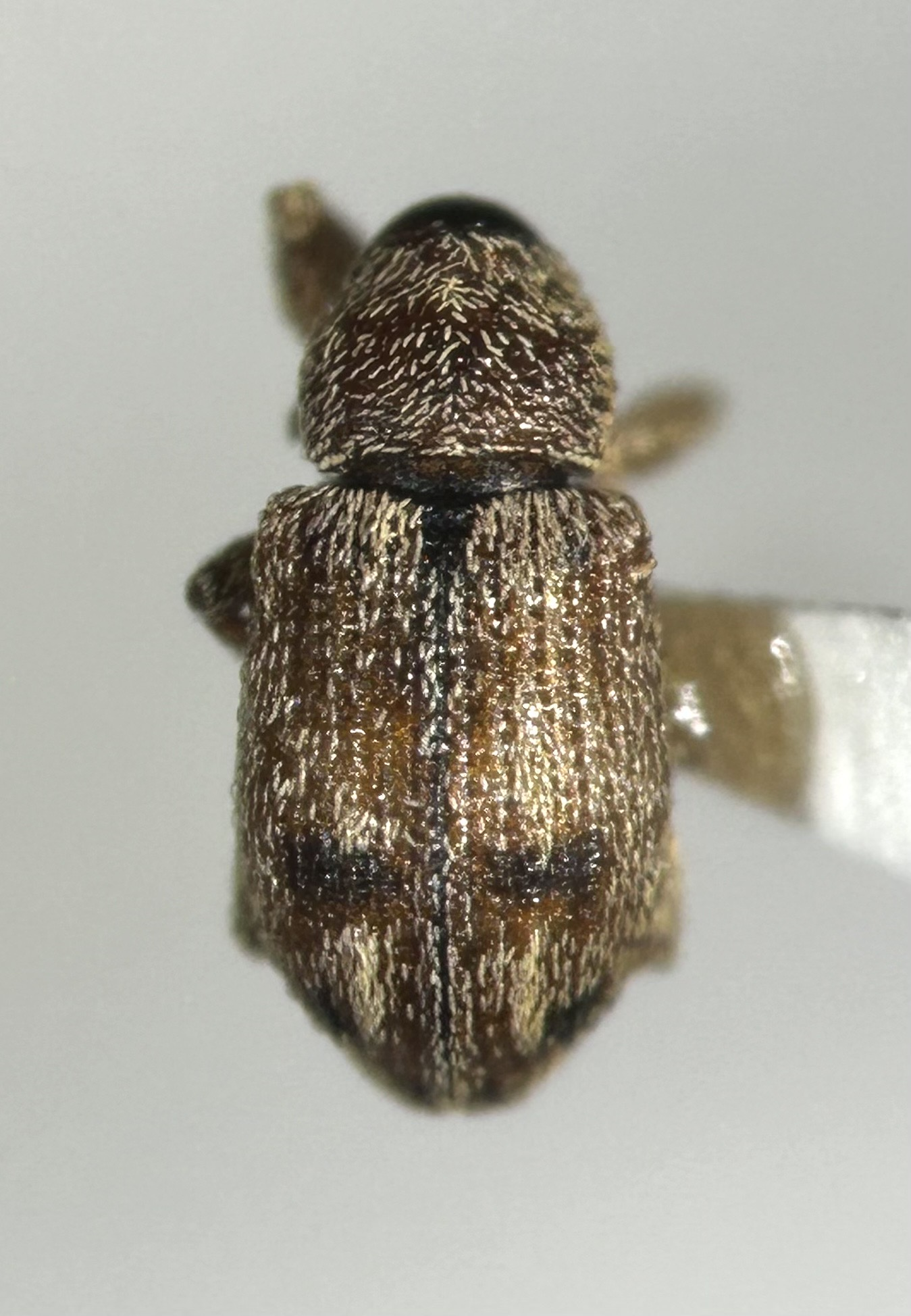
Dorsal surface of the same Misophrice sp.

Misophrice is an Australian genus of true weevils associated with plants in the family Casuarinaceae.

== Description ==
Misophrice adults are quite small weevils. For example, M. squamiventris is 2-3 mm long and M. gloriosa is 1.7-2 mm long. They lack the final, claw-bearing segment of each tarsus. Some related genera also have clawless tarsi, but Misophrice can be distinguished from these by the funicle of the antenna being 6-segmented (5-segmented in Anarciarthrum and 7-segmented in Thechia). The first funicle segment in Misophrice is stout and about as long as the second and third combined, while the second segment is slightly longer than the third. The rostrum is either entirely glabrous or glabrous except for the base. The body of at least some species is covered in scales.

The elytra of these weevils varies in appearance. In 1927, the entomologist Arthur Mills Lea divided the genus into six groups based on this: elytra tuberculate, elytra with numerous erect bristles, surface (=derm) of elytra entirely covered in scales, surface of elytra entirely black, surface of elytra with isolated dark spots, and surface of elytra at most with base and suture dark.

The internal anatomy of two Misophrice species, along with many other weevils, has been studied. The crop is well-developed (and full of pollen grains, in the specimens studied), as is the proventriculus. The mid gut is longer than the hind gut. There are six Malpighian tubules, inserted as a group of four tubules and two tubules separately. The prothoracic ganglion is only partially fused to the mesothoracic ganglion.

== Ecology ==
Misophrice has variously been described as associated with Casuarina, Allocasuarina or both. According to Lea, the genus is "practically confined" to Casuarina and is abundant on them, but has rarely been collected from other plants. A 2011 study reported these weevils on the species C. equisetifolia, C. glauca and C. cunninghamiana.

Misophrice have been described as pollen feeders, presumably based on the aforementioned finding of pollen in adult crops. It is unknown what larvae feed on.
