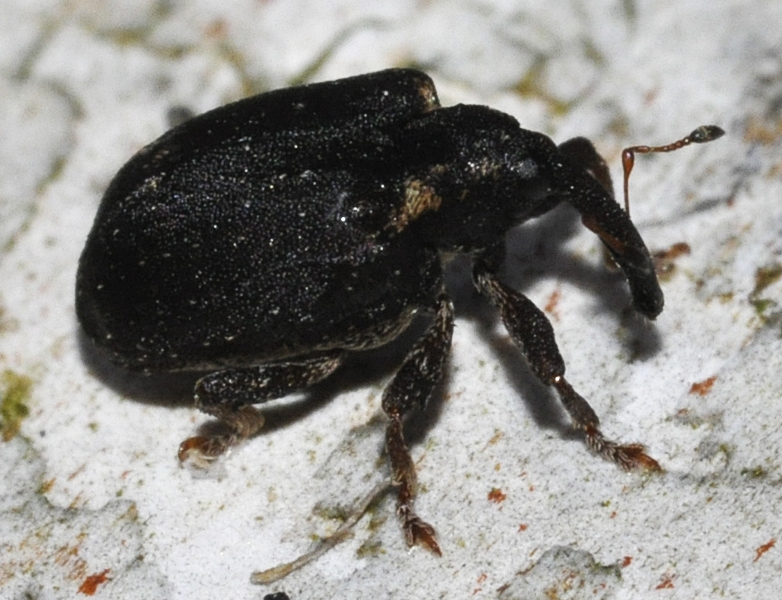
- Stereonychus fraxini

Scientific classification
- Domain: Eukaryota
- Kingdom: Animalia
- Phylum: Arthropoda
- Class: Insecta
- Order: Coleoptera
- Suborder: Polyphaga
- Infraorder: Cucujiformia
- Family: Curculionidae
- Genus: Stereonychus; Suffrian, 1854

= Stereonychus =

Genus of beetles

Stereonychus is a genus of beetles belonging to the family Curculionidae.

The species of this genus are found in Europe and Japan.

Species:

- Stereonychus alternoguttata Marcu, 1951
- Stereonychus angulicollis Voss, 1953
