= Piazorhinus =

Scientific classification
- Kingdom: Animalia
- Phylum: Arthropoda
- Class: Insecta
- Order: Coleoptera
- Suborder: Polyphaga
- Infraorder: Cucujiformia
- Family: Curculionidae
- Subfamily: Curculioninae
- Genus: Piazorhinus; Schönherr, 1835

Genus of beetles

Piazorhinus is a genus of true weevils in the beetle family Curculionidae. There are about eight described species in Piazorhinus.

== Species ==
These eight species belong to the genus Piazorhinus:

- Piazorhinus guyanensis (Hustache, 1939)
- Piazorhinus leucopectoralis Voss, 1934
- Piazorhinus myops Fåhraeus, 1843
- Piazorhinus pictus LeConte, 1876
- Piazorhinus scutellaris (Say, 1826)
- Piazorhinus thoracicus (Casey, 1910)
- Piazorhinus tuberculatus Blatchley, 1916
- Piazorhinus unicolor Voss, 1934
