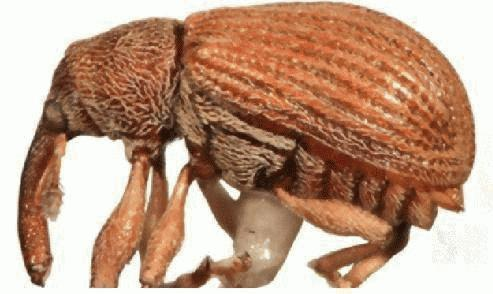
- Pseudanthonomus helvolus

Scientific classification
- Domain: Eukaryota
- Kingdom: Animalia
- Phylum: Arthropoda
- Class: Insecta
- Order: Coleoptera
- Suborder: Polyphaga
- Infraorder: Cucujiformia
- Family: Curculionidae
- Tribe: Anthonomini
- Genus: Pseudanthonomus; Dietz, 1891

= Pseudanthonomus =

Genus of beetles

Pseudanthonomus is a genus of true weevils in the beetle family Curculionidae. There are more than 60 described species in Pseudanthonomus.

== Species ==
These 63 species belong to the genus Pseudanthonomus:

- Pseudanthonomus apionoides Champion & G.C., 1903
- Pseudanthonomus baryon Clark, 1990
- Pseudanthonomus bellus Hustache, 1930
- Pseudanthonomus boson Clark, 1990
- Pseudanthonomus brunneus Dietz, 1891
- Pseudanthonomus canescens Faust & J., 1893
- Pseudanthonomus carinulatus Faust & J., 1893
- Pseudanthonomus concolor Clark, 1992
- Pseudanthonomus crataegi (Walsh, 1867)
- Pseudanthonomus cretaceus Champion & G.C., 1903
- Pseudanthonomus crinitus Champion, 1910
- Pseudanthonomus curvicrus Champion & G.C., 1903
- Pseudanthonomus dietzi Clark, 1987
- Pseudanthonomus electron Clark, 1990
- Pseudanthonomus facetus Dietz, 1891
- Pseudanthonomus fermion Clark, 1990
- Pseudanthonomus gluon Clark, 1990
- Pseudanthonomus griseipilis Champion & G.C., 1903
- Pseudanthonomus guttatus Champion & G.C., 1903
- Pseudanthonomus hadron Clark, 1990
- Pseudanthonomus hamamelidis Pierce & W.D., 1908
- Pseudanthonomus helvolus (Boheman, 1843)
- Pseudanthonomus hispidus Champion & G.C., 1903
- Pseudanthonomus incipiens Dietz, 1891
- Pseudanthonomus indignus Faust & J., 1893
- Pseudanthonomus inermis Blatchley & Leng, 1916
- Pseudanthonomus krameri Pierce
- Pseudanthonomus krameriae Pierce & W.D., 1908
- Pseudanthonomus lepton Clark, 1990
- Pseudanthonomus lituratus Champion & G.C., 1903
- Pseudanthonomus longulus Dietz, 1891
- Pseudanthonomus meridionalis Champion & G.C., 1903
- Pseudanthonomus meson Clark, 1990
- Pseudanthonomus mixtus Pierce & W.D., 1908
- Pseudanthonomus muon Clark, 1990
- Pseudanthonomus nanus LeConte & J.L., 1896
- Pseudanthonomus neutrino Clark, 1990
- Pseudanthonomus neutron Clark, 1990
- Pseudanthonomus nubilosus Champion & G.C., 1903
- Pseudanthonomus nucleon Clark, 1990
- Pseudanthonomus parton Clark, 1990
- Pseudanthonomus parvulus Dietz, 1891
- Pseudanthonomus photino Clark, 1990
- Pseudanthonomus photon Clark, 1990
- Pseudanthonomus pion Clark, 1990
- Pseudanthonomus positron Clark, 1990
- Pseudanthonomus proton Clark, 1990
- Pseudanthonomus puncticollis Blatchley & Leng, 1916
- Pseudanthonomus pusillus Hustache, 1930
- Pseudanthonomus quark Clark, 1990
- Pseudanthonomus relictus Dietz, 1891
- Pseudanthonomus rufotestaceus Champion & G.C., 1903
- Pseudanthonomus rufulus Dietz, 1891
- Pseudanthonomus selectron Clark, 1990
- Pseudanthonomus seriatus Hustache, 1930
- Pseudanthonomus seriesetosus Dietz, 1891
- Pseudanthonomus seriestosus Dietz
- Pseudanthonomus sylvaticus Hustache, 1930
- Pseudanthonomus tachyon Clark, 1990
- Pseudanthonomus tau Clark, 1990
- Pseudanthonomus tomentosulus Dietz, 1891
- Pseudanthonomus tomentosus Faust & J., 1893
- Pseudanthonomus validus Dietz, 1891 (currant fruit weevil)
