= Brachonyx =

Scientific classification
- Domain: Eukaryota
- Kingdom: Animalia
- Phylum: Arthropoda
- Class: Insecta
- Order: Coleoptera
- Suborder: Polyphaga
- Infraorder: Cucujiformia
- Family: Curculionidae
- Subfamily: Curculioninae
- Tribe: Anthonomini
- Genus: Brachonyx; Schonherr, 1825

Genus of beetles

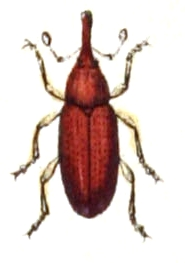
Brachonyx pineti

Brachonyx is a genus of beetles belonging to the family Curculionidae.

The genus was first described by Schönherr in 1825.

Synonyms:

- Sarapus Schönherr, 1826
- Brachyonyx Agassiz, 1846
- Onychobrachys Gistel, 1856

Species:

- Brachonyx pineti
