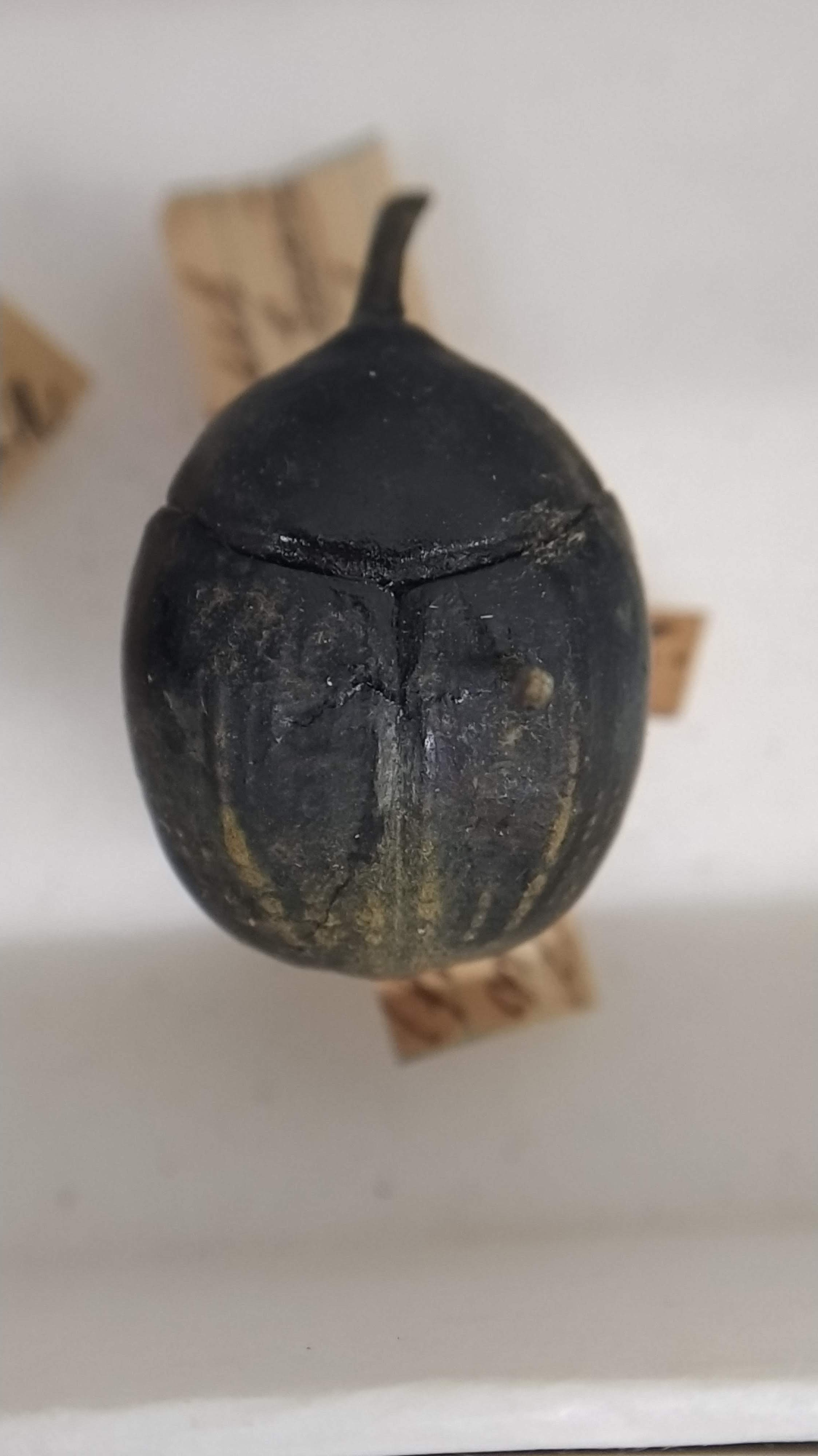
- Dorsal image

Conservation status
- Extinct

Scientific classification
- Kingdom: Animalia
- Phylum: Arthropoda
- Class: Insecta
- Order: Coleoptera
- Suborder: Polyphaga
- Infraorder: Cucujiformia
- Family: Curculionidae
- Subfamily: Curculioninae
- Tribe: Storeini
- Genus: †Hybomorphus; Saunders & Jekel, 1855
- Species: †H. melanosomus

Binomial name
- †Hybomorphus melanosomus Saunders & Jekel, 1855

= Hybomorphus =

Genus of insects

Hybomorphus is a genus of weevil in the family Curculionidae. There is just one species in the genus, the type species, Hybomorphus melanosomus, the Lord Howe Island ground weevil.

The genus and the type species were first described by William Wilson Saunders and Henri Jekel in 1855.

The weevil is now presumed extinct, not having been seen since the late 19th century despite intensive collecting effort.
