= Nerthops =

Scientific classification
- Domain: Eukaryota
- Kingdom: Animalia
- Phylum: Arthropoda
- Class: Insecta
- Order: Coleoptera
- Suborder: Polyphaga
- Infraorder: Cucujiformia
- Family: Curculionidae
- Genus: Nerthops; Schoenherr, 1826

Genus of insects

Nerthops is a genus of beetles belonging to the family Curculionidae.

The species of this genus are found in Southern Africa.

Species:

- Nerthops calcaratus Boheman, 1835
- Nerthops elegans Fairmaire, 1900
