= Chelonychus =

Scientific classification
- Domain: Eukaryota
- Kingdom: Animalia
- Phylum: Arthropoda
- Class: Insecta
- Order: Coleoptera
- Suborder: Polyphaga
- Infraorder: Cucujiformia
- Family: Curculionidae
- Tribe: Anthonomini
- Genus: Chelonychus; Dietz, 1891

Genus of beetles

Chelonychus is a genus of true weevils in the beetle family Curculionidae. There are at least two described species in Chelonychus.

== Species ==
These two species belong to the genus Chelonychus:

- Chelonychus longipes Dietz, 1891^{i c b}
- Chelonychus stragulus Clark & Burke, 2002^{c}

Data sources: i = ITIS, c = Catalogue of Life, g = GBIF, b = Bugguide.net
