= Aneuma =

Spanish melodic death metal/metalcore band

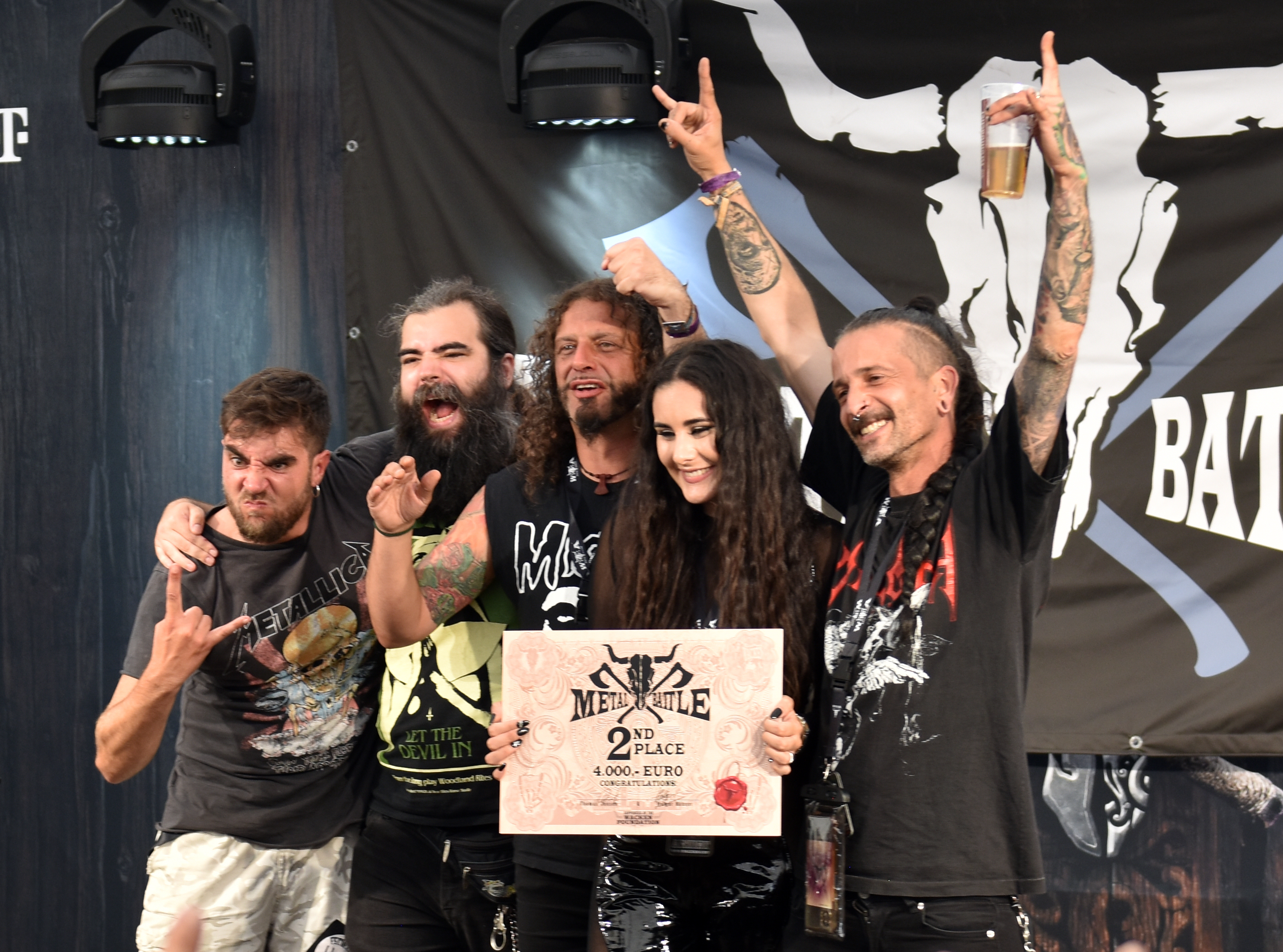
- Aneuma at 2023 Wacken Open Air Battle

Background information
- Origin: Navia, Asturias – Spain
- Genres: Melodic death metal, metalcore
- Years active: 2020–present
- Members: Laura Alfonso; Abel Suárez; Borja Suárez; Jorge Rodríguez; Pau

Aneuma is a Spanish melodic death metal/metalcore band. The band members are from Navia, Asturias. The band won the 2nd place in the 2023 Wacken Open Air metal battle competition.

== History ==
The band was formed in 2020 in Spain. They released their first studio album on 29 October 2022.

On 2 August 2023, the band performed at Wacken Open Air. At that festival, the band also won the 2nd place in the metal battle.

== Members ==
=== Current members ===
- Laura Alfonso - lead vocals
- Abel Suárez - guitars
- Borja Suárez - guitars
- Jorge Rodríguez Martínez - drums
- Fernando Pérez García (Pau) - bass

== Discography ==
- Climax (Independent 2022)
