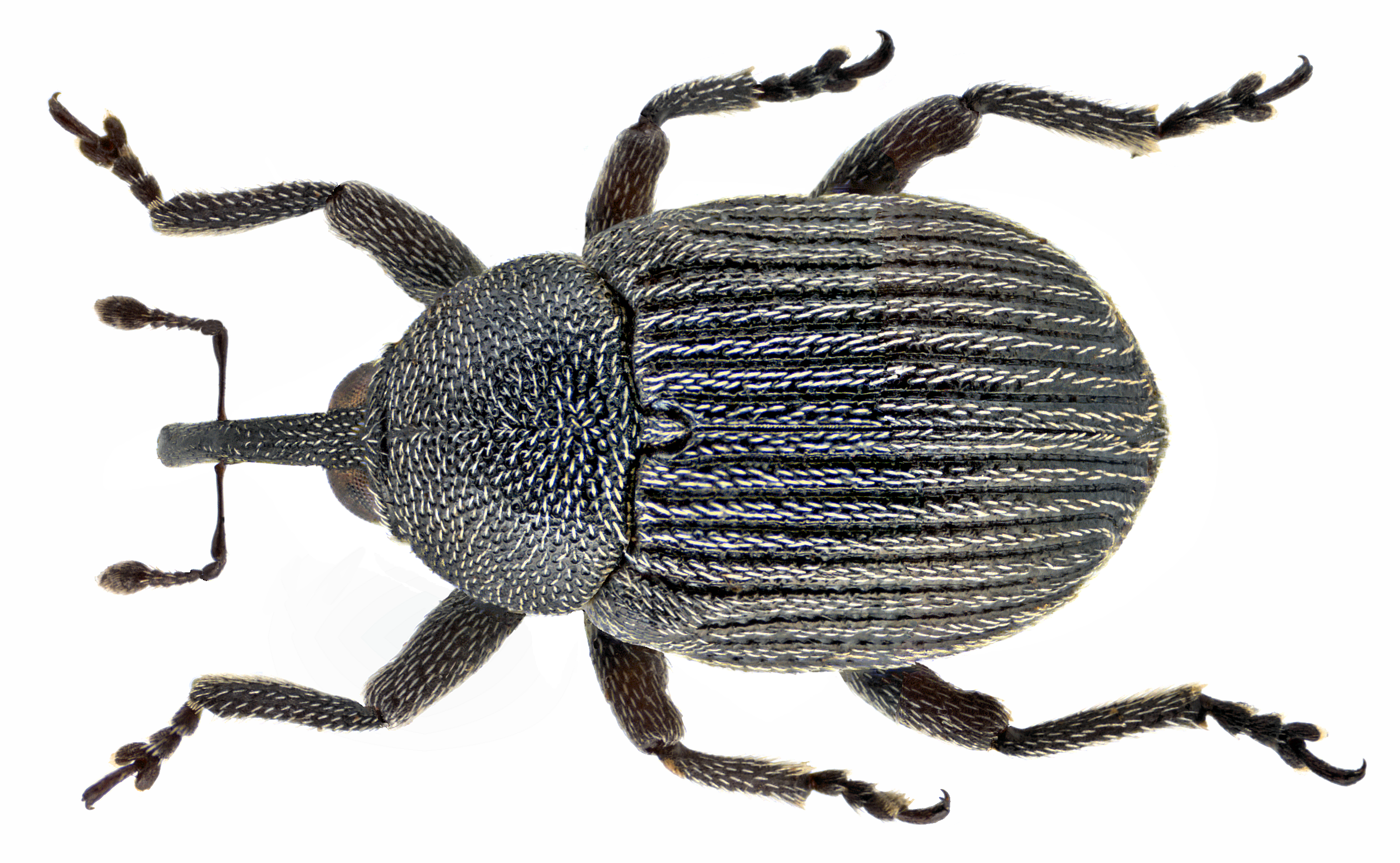
- Miarus campanulae

Scientific classification
- Domain: Eukaryota
- Kingdom: Animalia
- Phylum: Arthropoda
- Class: Insecta
- Order: Coleoptera
- Suborder: Polyphaga
- Infraorder: Cucujiformia
- Family: Curculionidae
- Genus: Miarus; Schönherr, 1825

= Miarus =

Genus of beetles

Miarus is a genus of beetles belonging to the family Curculionidae.

The species of this genus are found in Europe, Africa, Japan and Northern America.

Species:

- Miarus abeillei Desbrochers, 1893
- Miarus abnormis Solari, 1947
- Miarus campanulae (Linnaeus, 1767)
