= Guy Anstruther Knox Marshall =

British entomologist (1871–1959)

Sir Guy Anstruther Knox Marshall FRS (20 December 1871 in Amritsar, Punjab – 8 April 1959 in London), was an Indian-born British entomologist. He worked at the Bureau of Entomology which was later called the Imperial Institute of Entomology (which was later merged into the Commonwealth Agricultural Bureau) serving as its director from 1913 to 1942 and was an expert on African and oriental weevils. He described nearly 2300 species.

== Early life ==
Marshall was born in Amritsar, the youngest of three children born to Laura Frances Pollock (1846–1912), daughter of Sir Frederick Pollock, 1st Baronet and Chief Baron of the Exchequer, and Colonel Charles Henry Tilson Marshall (1841–1927), a district judge. Both Guy's father and his uncle, Major-General George Frederick Leycester Marshall (1843–1934), were naturalists who had produced books on the birds and butterflies of India, Burma, and Ceylon.

Marshall was sent from India to a school in Margate where he started a butterfly collection with the encouragement of a German headmaster. He transferred his attentions to beetles when he enrolled at Charterhouse. When he failed the Indian Civil Service entrance examination, his father shipped him off to Natal in South Africa to learn sheep farming in 1895. He ended up in Rhodesia, managing the Salisbury District and Estates Company and owning two farms, one managed by Charles Francis Massy Swynnerton.

== Career and correspondences ==
Marshall corresponded with the prominent Darwinian, Edward Bagnall Poulton, Hope Professor of Zoology at Oxford University who had written The Colours of Animals (1890). Poulton urged Marshall to study insect colours in mimicry and camouflage. Throughout this research project Marshall put together a collection of plant specimens from southern Africa. His findings were published as a joint paper in Transactions of the Entomological Society of London in 1902.

Poulton later helped Marshall in obtaining an appointment as curator at Sarawak Museum. Marshall, however, became ill during a stay-over in London and never took up the position. When some of his papers on weevils were published, he was offered an appointment as scientific secretary to the Entomological Research Committee (Tropical Africa) in 1909. The committee's function was to post field entomologists to East and West Africa who would study insects harmful to humans, crops and animals and send specimens to the Natural History Museum in London for identification. Under Marshall's management the Committee grew into a powerful and efficient body. In 1913 it was called the Imperial Institute of Entomology and Marshall was made its director. Eventually all the agricultural information services were merged as the Commonwealth Agricultural Bureaux (CAB). Marshall established the biological control service at Farnham House, giving rise to a global network of laboratories and creating two scientific publications: the Bulletin of Entomological Research and the Review of Applied Entomology. He served as a director until his retirement in 1942 when the position was taken up by S. A. Neave.

Marshall's organisation took on the enormous task of writing up the ‘Insecta’ division of The Zoological Record. In 1916 he received an honorary doctorate from the University of Oxford for his contribution to economic entomology. He was elected Honorary Fellow of the Royal Entomological Society of London

== Honors ==
Marshall received many honors – he was elected to the Royal Society, the American Academy of Arts and Sciences, the Royal Society of New Zealand, the Indian Institute of Science, the Royal Belgian Entomological Society, and the Russian Entomological Society. He was awarded l’Ordre de la Couronne from the Belgian Government, a CMG in 1920, a knighthood in 1930, and with his retirement in 1942, the KCMG.

Marshall's identification work at the institute led to his extensive knowledge of insect taxonomy. His specialising in the Curculionidae was by accident rather than design, as they were the only group left intact after a trip to England in 1896. In total he wrote up some 2300 new species in some 200 papers. After his retirement the Natural History Museum set aside office space for his taxonomic work, with which he continued until shortly before his death. Marshall married Hilda Margaret (died 1964), daughter of David Alexander Maxwell, and widow of James Ffolliott Darling, in 1933. They had no children. Marshall died at his home at 31 Melton Court, London.

A species of African dwarf chameleon, Rhampholeon marshalli, is named in his honor.

== Bibliography ==
Among the publications of Marshall are:

- Marshall, Guy Anstruther Knox (1916). Coleoptera: Rhynchophora:-Curculionidæ. London: Taylor and Francis. OCLC 3588180 (volume of The Fauna of British India, Including Ceylon and Burma, ed. A.E. Shipley).
- —— (1948). "Entomological Results from the Swedish Expedition 1934 to Burma and British India-Coleoptera: Curculionidae". Novitates Zoologicae. 42 (3): 397–473.
- —— (1956). The Otiorrhynchine Curculionidae of the tribe Celeuthetini (Col.). London: Printed by Order of the Trustees of the British Museum. OCLC 737816.
