= List of Baris species =

More than 900 species belong to Baris, a genus in the weevil family Curculionidae.

== Baris species ==
- Baris abeillei Desbrochers, J., 1892
- Baris abrotani Schenkling, K., 1907
- Baris abrupta Casey, T.L., 1892
- Baris abruptelineata Hustache, A., 1938
- Baris abyssinica Hustache, 1936
- Baris accidirostris Zaslavskij, 1956
- Baris achyranthis Marshall, 1938
- Baris aciculaticollis Boheman, C.H. in Schönherr, C.J., 1844
- Baris acutesculpta Fairmaire, L., 1886
- Baris adducta Hustache, A., 1937
- Baris admirabilis Hustache, 1951
- Baris adustula Casey, 1920
- Baris aegypta Kirsch, T., 1881
- Baris aeneipennis Hustache, A., 1929
- Baris aeneomicans Casey, T.L., 1892
- Baris aeneonitens Hustache, 1939
- Baris aeneopicea Champion, G.C., 1909
- Baris aenescens Champion, G.C., 1909
- Baris aerata Hustache, A., 1938
- Baris aerea Blatchley, W.S. & Leng, C.W., 1916
- Baris affabra Boheman, C.H. in Schönherr, C.J., 1844
- Baris agnita Casey, 1920
- Baris agricola Casey, 1920
- Baris albiguttata Lea, A.M., 1906
- Baris albocscutellata Hustache, A., 1938
- Baris albomaculata Hustache, A., 1938
- Baris albomarginata Desbrochers, J., 1892
- Baris alboparsa Hustache, A., 1938
- Baris albopicta Lea, A.M., 1906
- Baris alboseriata Reitter, 1908
- Baris albosignata Hustache, A., 1938
- Baris alcaidei Hoffmann, 1957
- Baris alcyonea Hustache, A., 1938
- Baris algirica Desbrochers, J., 1892
- Baris alluaudi Hustache, 1922
- Baris alternans Casey, 1920
- Baris alternata Hustache, A., 1938
- Baris amanda Faust, J., 1895
- Baris amanicola Pic, M., 1905
- Baris amaniensis Hustache, A., 1932
- Baris amaranthi Marshall, 1936
- Baris amazonica Casey, 1922
- Baris ambigua Hustache, A., 1938
- Baris ambovobensis Hustache, A., 1924
- Baris ambovombensis Hustache, 1922
- Baris americana Hustache, A., 1938
- Baris amica Faust, J., 1894
- Baris amnicola Casey, 1920
- Baris amoenula Hustache, A., 1938
- Baris amplicollis Hustache, 1938
- Baris analis (Olivier, A.G., 1791)
- Baris anaplata Casey, 1920
- Baris ancilla Casey, T.L., 1892
- Baris andalusica Porta, 1932
- Baris andranofotsyensis Richard, 1956
- Baris angophorae Lea, A.M., 1906
- Baris angusta Porta, 1932
- Baris antennalis Lea, 1931
- Baris anthracina Sturm,
- Baris antiqua Dejean, 1837
- Baris anxia Faust, J., 1894
- Baris aperta Casey, T.L., 1892
- Baris apicinivea Lea, 1915
- Baris appalachia Casey, 1920
- Baris apposita Casey, 1920
- Baris aprica Casey, T.L., 1892
- Baris apricoides Fall, 1913
- Baris araxicola Reitter, E., 1895
- Baris arctithorax Hustache, A., 1938
- Baris argentata Dejean, 1830
- Baris argenteopicta Hustache, 1921
- Baris argentinica Hustache, 1951
- Baris arizonica Casey, T.L., 1892
- Baris armata Dejean, 1837
- Baris armeniaca Hustache, A., 1938
- Baris armipes Roelofs, W., 1875
- Baris artemisiae (Panzer, G.W.F., 1794)
- Baris ashevillensis Casey, 1920
- Baris aspera Champion, G.C., 1909
- Baris aspersa Marshall, 1948
- Baris assiniensis Hustache, A., 1932
- Baris atlasica Hustache, A., 1923
- Baris atra Hustache, A., 1938
- Baris atramentaria Kuhnt, P., 1912
- Baris atrata Sturm, 1826
- Baris atricolor Porta, 1932
- Baris atriplicis Stephens, 1831
- Baris atrocoerulea Hustache, A., 1938
- Baris atronitens Portevin, G., 1935
- Baris atropolita Lea, 1931
- Baris attonsa Casey, 1920
- Baris auliensis Reitter, E., 1901
- Baris aurea Sturm, 1826
- Baris auricoma Hustache, A., 1938
- Baris aurifasciata Escalera, M.M. de la, 1914
- Baris aurita Dejean,
- Baris aurosignata Hustache, A., 1938
- Baris austiniana Casey, 1920
- Baris australiae Lea, A.M., 1906
- Baris australis Blatchley, 1920
- Baris axillaris Dejean, 1837
- Baris azurea Jacquelin du Val, C. in Ramon, 1857
- Baris babaulti Hustache, 1921
- Baris badia Dejean, 1837
- Baris bagoides Richard, 1956
- Baris balassogloi Faust, J., 1885
- Baris balteata Casey, 1922
- Baris bardus Dejean, 1837
- Baris barronensis Lea, 1927
- Baris basipennis Lea, 1931
- Baris basirostris Lea, A.M., 1906
- Baris beauprei Hustache, 1938
- Baris beckeri Bondar, 1960
- Baris behanzini Hustache, 1928
- Baris behnei Korotyaev, 1987
- Baris belovi Korotyaev, 1987
- Baris bengaense Hustache, A., 1937
- Baris bialbivittata Lea, 1931
- Baris bidens Dejean,
- Baris bigibbosa Hustache, 1928
- Baris bigrammicus Germar, E.F., 1824
- Baris bimaculata Pajni & Kohli, 1990
- Baris bimaculibasis Lea, 1931
- Baris binaghii Solari, 1952
- Baris bispiculata Casey, T.L., 1920
- Baris bispilota Hope, F.W. in Gray,
- Baris bituberculata Lea, 1927
- Baris bivittatus Heller, K.M., 1901
- Baris blanda Dejean,
- Baris blatchleyi Hustache, A., 1938
- Baris bohemani Schultze, 1897
- Baris borkhsenii Zaslavskij, 1956
- Baris bosqi Hustache, 1951
- Baris boussoi Hustache, 1928
- Baris brachyrhina Casey, 1920
- Baris brannani Hustache, A., 1938
- Baris brasiliense Hustache, 1951
- Baris brassicae Dufour, 1851
- Baris brevipennis Casey, 1920
- Baris brevirostris Hustache, A., 1938
- Baris brevisetis Hustache, 1928
- Baris brevissima Roubal, 1927
- Baris brisouti Reitter, E., 1895
- Baris brunneipes Casey, T.L., 1892
- Baris brunneopilosa Hustache, A., 1924
- Baris bryanti Lea, 1915
- Baris buanensis Hustache, A., 1937
- Baris caerulescens Germar, 1824
- Baris caffra Boheman, C.H. in Schönherr, C.J., 1836
- Baris cairnsensis Lea, 1927
- Baris calaidis Chevrolat L.A.A, 1880
- Baris caldaria Champion, G.C., 1909
- Baris californica Casey, T.L., 1892
- Baris caliginosa Hustache, A., 1938
- Baris callida Casey, T.L., 1892
- Baris callosa Hustache, 1933
- Baris calva Hustache, 1956
- Baris canadensis Blatchley & Leng, 1916
- Baris carbonaria Blatchley & Leng, 1916
- Baris carinipennis Hustache, 1936
- Baris carinirostris Ramesha & Ramamurthy, 2011
- Baris cariniventris Solari, F., 1908
- Baris carinulata Casey, T.L., 1920
- Baris carneri Pic, M., 1922
- Baris carnifex Dejean, 1836
- Baris carolinensis Casey, T.L., 1920
- Baris caseyi Hustache, A., 1938
- Baris castaneicornis Lea, 1931
- Baris catamarcaensis Hustache, 1951
- Baris cataphracta Peyerimhoff, 1925
- Baris catenulata Dejean, 1837
- Baris caucasica Schultze, W., 1897
- Baris caudalis Casey, 1920
- Baris cauta Casey, 1920
- Baris cavernosa Champion, G.C., 1909
- Baris caviceps Marshall, 1941
- Baris celosiae Marshall, 1938
- Baris celtis Hustache, A., 1938
- Baris chalybaea Hustache, A., 1938
- Baris chalybea Sturm, 1826
- Baris championina Casey, 1920
- Baris chapadana Casey, 1922
- Baris charbinensis Zaslavskij, 1956
- Baris chevrolati Reitter, E., 1895
- Baris chinensis Frivaldszky, J., 1892
- Baris chloris Hustache, A., 1938
- Baris chlorizans Portevin, G., 1935
- Baris chlorodia Wagner, H. in Calwer, 1916
- Baris chloroptera Fuente, 1906
- Baris chrysis Sturm, 1826
- Baris ciliata Hustache, 1951
- Baris cinereus Dejean,
- Baris circumscutellata Hustache, A., 1924
- Baris circumstellata Hustache, 1924
- Baris cirsii Gilbert, 1964
- Baris civilis Péringuey, L. in Schultze, W., 1908
- Baris clandestina Faust, J., 1887
- Baris coelestis Lea, 1927
- Baris coerulescens Germar, E.F., 1824
- Baris collarti Hustache, 1937
- Baris coloradensis Casey, 1920
- Baris colorata Boheman, C.H. in Schönherr, C.J., 1836
- Baris coltonensis Casey, 1920
- Baris columbiana Casey, 1920
- Baris complanatus Dejean, 1835
- Baris concinna Reitter, E., 1895
- Baris conferta Casey, T.L., 1892
- Baris confinis LeConte, J.L., 1876
- Baris conicollis Marshall, 1928
- Baris consulta Faust, J., 1886
- Baris convergens Lea, 1931
- Baris convexicollis Reitter, E., 1895
- Baris copiosepunctata Zaslavskij, 1956
- Baris coracina Hustache, A., 1938
- Baris cordiae Marshall, 1923
- Baris cordipennis Lea, 1931
- Baris cordobaense Hustache, 1951
- Baris coreana Kolbe, H.J., 1886
- Baris corinthia Porta, 1932
- Baris corsicana Schultze, 1913
- Baris corusca Champion, G.C., 1909
- Baris crambephaga Korotyaev & Gültekin, 1999
- Baris crassipes Reitter, E., 1895
- Baris crassirostris Hustache, A., 1938
- Baris crenata Klug,
- Baris crenatostriata Péringuey, L. in Schultze, W., 1908
- Baris crenulita Casey, 1920
- Baris cribellata Reitter, E., 1885
- Baris cribrifera Casey, 1920
- Baris croceosignata Hustache, 1939
- Baris cruda Casey, 1920
- Baris cruenta Faust, J., 1899
- Baris cucurbitae Marshall, 1946
- Baris cuneipennis Casey, T.L., 1892
- Baris cuprea Dejean, 1837
- Baris curvirostris Hustache, A., 1938
- Baris cyaneotincta Lea, 1927
- Baris cyaneus Curtis, 1829
- Baris czerskyi Zaslavskij, 1956
- Baris dalmatina Porta, 1932
- Baris davidi Fairmaire, L., 1878
- Baris decorata Faust, J., 1895
- Baris decorsei Hustache, 1922
- Baris defecta Casey, 1922
- Baris deflexa Hustache, A., 1938
- Baris deformis Casey, T.L., 1892
- Baris demissa Casey, 1920
- Baris denverensis Casey, 1920
- Baris deplanata Roelofs, W., 1875
- Baris despecta Casey, 1922
- Baris despicata Reitter, E., 1895
- Baris devillei Solari, 1952
- Baris dilatata Casey, T.L., 1892
- Baris dilatatifrons Lea, 1927
- Baris dimidiata Reitter, E., 1897
- Baris discipula Casey, T.L., 1892
- Baris discolor Hustache, A., 1938
- Baris dispersesquamulata Hustache, 1951
- Baris dispilota Hustache, A., 1938
- Baris distigma Richard, 1956
- Baris distinguenda Fairmaire, L., 1904
- Baris dodonis Marshall, 1936
- Baris dolosa Marshall, 1933
- Baris doriae Hustache, A., 1938
- Baris dorsalis Hustache, A., 1938
- Baris dufaui Hustache, 1932
- Baris durangoana Champion, G.C., 1909
- Baris dzhungarica Korotyaev, 1987
- Baris ebangaense Hustache, 1936
- Baris ebangaensis Hustache, A., 1935
- Baris ebenina Pascoe, F.P., 1885
- Baris eburifera Pascoe, F.P., 1887
- Baris edentata Lea, 1931
- Baris edmundi Korotyaev, 1987
- Baris edoughensis Reitter, E., 1895
- Baris ekonaensis Hustache, A., 1937
- Baris elevata Reitter, E., 1899
- Baris elliptica Lea, A.M., 1906
- Baris endroedyi Hoffmann, 1968
- Baris episternalis Lea, 1927
- Baris erubescens Kirsch, T., 1869
- Baris erysimi Chobaut, 1917
- Baris erysimioides Hoffmann, 1942
- Baris erythrocollis Hustache, 1939
- Baris erythropus Dejean, 1837
- Baris esuriens Casey, 1920
- Baris esuriensis Casey, T.L., 1920
- Baris euryophora Boheman, C.H. in Schönherr, C.J., 1836
- Baris eurysterna Lea, 1931
- Baris exarata Dejean, 1837
- Baris excellens Faust, J., 1895
- Baris exigua Casey, T.L., 1892
- Baris ezoana Kôno, 1940
- Baris fallaciosa Hoffmann, A., 1959
- Baris fallax Desbrochers, J., 1892
- Baris fervida Pascoe, F.P., 1886
- Baris festiva Hoffmann, 1965
- Baris fimbriata Faust, J., 1885
- Baris flaccida Casey, 1922
- Baris flavipes Hustache, A., 1938
- Baris flaviventris Sturm, 1826
- Baris flavonotata Voss, 1941
- Baris flavosignata Roelofs, W., 1879
- Baris flexuosa Hustache, A., 1938
- Baris floridensis Casey, T.L., 1892
- Baris fluctuosa Champion, G.C., 1909
- Baris formalis Casey, 1920
- Baris foveata Lea, 1931
- Baris fracta Casey, 1920
- Baris fratuelis Champion, G.C., 1909
- Baris freyi Zumpt, 1937
- Baris fucata Dejean,
- Baris fukienensis Voss, 1955
- Baris fultoni Casey, 1920
- Baris fulvicornis Pascoe, F.P., 1885
- Baris fulvipes Casey, 1922
- Baris fulvoapicata Hustache, 1951
- Baris fusciventris Fairmaire, L., 1901
- Baris futilis Casey, T.L., 1892
- Baris gagatina Dejean, 1830
- Baris galliae Tempère, 1961
- Baris gallica Desbrochers, J., 1892
- Baris gandaense Hustache, 1936
- Baris gandaensis Hustache, A., 1935
- Baris genitiva Casey, 1920
- Baris geraldtonensis Lea, 1927
- Baris gibbicollis Lea, 1931
- Baris gimmerthali Hochhuth, I.H., 1849
- Baris glabra Lea, A.M., 1906
- Baris glabrata Dejean, 1837
- Baris glyptobaroides Hustache, 1933
- Baris goekseli Korotyaev & Gültekin, 2003
- Baris gradata Casey, 1920
- Baris graminis Hustache, A., 1938
- Baris grandicollis Schultze, W., 1905
- Baris granulipennis Hustache, A., 1938
- Baris gravida Casey, T.L., 1892
- Baris griseopubens Fairmaire, L., 1902
- Baris gudenusi Schultze, W., 1901
- Baris gyrosicollis Hustache, 1933
- Baris helleri Hartmann, 1897
- Baris herifuga Casey, 1922
- Baris heringi Voss, 1963
- Baris heterodoxa Fall, H.C., 1902
- Baris heterorhynchus Hustache, 1932
- Baris heydeni Desbrochers, J., 1900
- Baris himalayana Faust, J., 1894
- Baris hispidula Casey, T.L., 1892
- Baris hochhuthi Faust, J., 1888
- Baris holdereri Reitter, E., 1900
- Baris holosericea Dejean,
- Baris hoplocnemis Lea, 1927
- Baris hovana Hustache, A., 1924
- Baris hovanus Hustache, 1922
- Baris humeralis Dejean, 1837
- Baris humerosa Casey, 1920
- Baris hyperion Casey, T.L., 1892
- Baris ibis LeConte, J.L., 1868
- Baris ignifera Fuente, 1901
- Baris illepida Lea, 1927
- Baris immaculatipennis Hustache, 1932
- Baris immunis Casey, 1920
- Baris implana Champion, G.C., 1909
- Baris impolita Hustache, A., 1938
- Baris impressifrons Dejean, 1837
- Baris impressipennis Faust, J., 1894
- Baris impunctata Stephens, J.F., 1831
- Baris inanis Casey, 1922
- Baris inconspicua Casey, T.L., 1892
- Baris inculta Casey, T.L., 1920
- Baris indigna Hustache, A., 1938
- Baris infima Hustache, 1956
- Baris ingens Casey, T.L., 1892
- Baris inopina Champion, G.C., 1909
- Baris inops Dejean, 1837
- Baris instans Casey, 1920
- Baris insularis Desbrochers, J., 1895
- Baris intacta Casey, 1920
- Baris intercalaris Faust, J., 1885
- Baris intermedia Hoffmann, 1950
- Baris interrupta (Boheman, 1836)
- Baris interruptofasciata Hustache, A., 1938
- Baris interstitialis (Say, T., 1824)
- Baris inusita Lea, A.M., 1931
- Baris inusitata Lea, 1931
- Baris irregularis Casey, T.L., 1920
- Baris irrita Casey, 1920
- Baris irrorata Hustache, A., 1938
- Baris janthina Porta, 1932
- Baris jocosa Casey, 1922
- Baris joffrei Hustache, 1926
- Baris johanni Korotyaev, 1987
- Baris jonesi Ramesha & Ramamurthy, 2011
- Baris jonica Desbrochers, J., 1892
- Baris kakoense Hustache, 1934
- Baris kakoensis Hustache, A., 1937
- Baris kapirensis Hustache, 1924
- Baris kaszabi Korotyaev, 1995
- Baris kaufmanni Reitter, E., 1897
- Baris kenyae Hustache, 1929
- Baris kiboshi Nakane, 1963
- Baris kiesenwetteri Faust, J., 1890
- Baris kijabensis Hustache, 1929
- Baris kiritshenkoi Zaslavskij, 1956
- Baris kirschi Reitter, E., 1895
- Baris kisilkumia Bajtenov, 1974
- Baris kivuensis Hustache, A., 1938
- Baris korbi Schultze, W., 1899
- Baris krausei Korotyaev, 1987
- Baris kryzhanovskii Zaslavskij, 1956
- Baris kurentzovi Egorov, 1977
- Baris kuvanguense Hustache, 1938
- Baris kuvanguensis Hustache, A., 1937
- Baris lacteomaculata Heyden, 1911
- Baris laeta Hustache, A., 1938
- Baris laevissima Lea, 1931
- Baris laevistriata Hustache, 1956
- Baris landgrebei Faust, J., 1882
- Baris lanosella Casey, 1920
- Baris laodiophila Hustache, A., 1932
- Baris lata Hustache, A., 1938
- Baris lateralis Sturm, 1826
- Baris latericollis Lea, 1927
- Baris latevittata Aurivillius, 1912
- Baris laticollis Portevin, G., 1935
- Baris lavacana Casey, 1920
- Baris laxicollis Casey, 1920
- Baris leai Hustache, A., 1938
- Baris lebedevi Roubal, 1929
- Baris lembaensis Hustache, 1924
- Baris lengi Hustache, A., 1938
- Baris lepidii Porta, 1932
- Baris lethierryi Hustache, A., 1932
- Baris leucospila Pascoe, F.P., 1885
- Baris libanicola Hustache, A., 1938
- Baris licens Reitter, E., 1895
- Baris lignarius Stephens, 1829
- Baris limbata Reitter, E., 1895
- Baris limnobaroides Hustache, 1932
- Baris linearis Boheman, C.H., 1859
- Baris lineolata Aurivillius, 1910
- Baris liosoma Lea, 1931
- Baris litigiosa Desbrochers, J., 1892
- Baris littera Hustache, A., 1938
- Baris lividipes Dejean, 1837
- Baris longicollidis Hustache, A., 1938
- Baris longicollis Lea, 1915
- Baris longula Dejean, 1837
- Baris longulicollis Casey, 1920
- Baris lorata Marshall, 1911
- Baris lubrica Casey, T.L., 1892
- Baris lucens Hustache, 1956
- Baris lucida Stephens, 1829
- Baris luczoti Hustache, A., 1938
- Baris lundaense Hustache, 1936
- Baris lundaensis Hustache, A., 1935
- Baris macra LeConte, J.L., 1857
- Baris macraspis Champion, G.C., 1909
- Baris maculata Roelofs, W., 1879
- Baris maderi Voss, 1939
- Baris magister Pascoe, F.P., 1886
- Baris malachitica Hustache, A., 1938
- Baris malefida Hustache, 1939
- Baris managuensis Solari, F., 1906
- Baris maracandica Zaslavskij, 1956
- Baris marginicollis Hustache, A., 1938
- Baris maritima Roelofs, W., 1875
- Baris marshalli Ramesha & Ramamurthy, 2011
- Baris massaica Aurivillius, 1910
- Baris matrona Casey, 1920
- Baris mauretanica Schultze, 1913
- Baris mauritanica Schultze, W., 1904
- Baris maynei Hustache, 1924
- Baris mecinoides Reitter, E., 1895
- Baris megalops Lea, 1931
- Baris melaena Heyden, L., Reitter, E., Weise, J., 1906
- Baris melanaria Dejean, 1837
- Baris melancholica Roelofs, W., 1875
- Baris melanocephala Dejean, 1837
- Baris melanochroa Lea, 1927
- Baris melanoleucus Iablokov-Khnzorian, 1964
- Baris melanoptera Solari, 1952
- Baris melanostetha Lea, 1927
- Baris melas Solari, 1952
- Baris melillaensis Hoffmann, 1954
- Baris memnonia Porta, 1932
- Baris mendozensis Casey, 1922
- Baris menthae Kôno, 1937
- Baris meraca Casey, 1920
- Baris mesosternalis Lea, 1931
- Baris metallescens Dejean, 1837
- Baris metallica Dejean, 1837
- Baris metasternalis Casey, 1920
- Baris micans Dejean,
- Baris micronyx Hustache, 1933
- Baris microscopica Lea, A.M., 1906
- Baris miniata Hustache, 1924
- Baris minima Hartmann, 1904
- Baris minuens Casey, 1920
- Baris mirifica Iablokov-Khnzorian, 1959
- Baris mobilensis Casey, 1920
- Baris modesta Dejean,
- Baris modica Hustache, A., 1932
- Baris modicella Casey, 1920
- Baris mogadorica Escalera, M.M. de la, 1914
- Baris mollandini Hustache, 1937
- Baris mombasaense Hustache, 1934
- Baris monardae Pierce, W.D., 1907
- Baris monbaensis Hustache, A., 1934
- Baris monobia Lea, 1931
- Baris montanica Casey, 1920
- Baris montanus Pajni & Kohli, 1990
- Baris monticola Fall, H.C., 1901
- Baris morenoi Hustache, 1951
- Baris morio Portevin, G., 1935
- Baris mukanaensis Voss, 1962
- Baris multimaculata Lea, 1931
- Baris multivaga Champion, 1914
- Baris mutica Pascoe, F.P., 1885
- Baris naivashensis Hustache, 1929
- Baris nana Dejean, 1837
- Baris neelgheriensis Hustache, A., 1938
- Baris nemicasa Hustache, 1951
- Baris nemorhina Lea, 1931
- Baris nephiana Casey, 1920
- Baris neptis Casey, T.L., 1920
- Baris nesapia Faust, J., 1887
- Baris nevadica Fall, H.C., 1913
- Baris nicaraguensis Solari, F., 1906
- Baris nigella Dejean, 1837
- Baris nigra Faust, J., Reitter, E., 1895
- Baris nigritarsis Reitter, E., 1895
- Baris nigritula Marshall, 1945
- Baris nigrocephala Dejean, 1836
- Baris nipponica Kôno, H., 1928
- Baris nitens Hustache, A., 1938
- Baris nitida Dejean, 1837
- Baris nitidula Hustache, A., 1938
- Baris nitidus Dejean, 1835
- Baris nivalis Portevin, G., 1935
- Baris niveodispersa Lea, 1927
- Baris niveonotata Lea, A.M., 1906
- Baris nobilis Desbrochers, J., 1896
- Baris nodipennis Hustache, 1928
- Baris notata Klug,
- Baris notolineatus Pajni & Kohli, 1990
- Baris novaki Penecke, 1936
- Baris novella Casey, 1920
- Baris novemmaculata Hustache, A., 1938
- Baris obcrucis Dejean, 1837
- Baris oblata Casey, 1920
- Baris obliviosa Casey, 1922
- Baris oblonga Lea, A.M., 1906
- Baris oblongula Casey, T.L., 1892
- Baris obscura Hustache, 1938
- Baris obscuripes Lea, 1931
- Baris obsequens Casey, 1920
- Baris obumbrata Boheman, C.H. in Schönherr, C.J., 1844
- Baris occidentalis Hoffmann, 1954
- Baris occidua Champion, G.C., 1909
- Baris ocellata Desbrochers, J., 1900
- Baris ochivora Blackburn, T., 1900
- Baris ochraceomaculata Motschulsky, V. de, 1866
- Baris ochsi Hoffmann, 1950
- Baris olfersi Germar, E.F., 1824
- Baris opaca Hustache, A., 1938
- Baris opacovirens Voss, 1962
- Baris opacula Casey, T.L., 1892
- Baris opica Casey, 1922
- Baris opiparis Portevin, G., 1935
- Baris orientalis Roelofs, W., 1875
- Baris orthodoxa Lea, 1927
- Baris otjiwarongoana Voss, 1960
- Baris ovalis Richard, 1956
- Baris oviculata Casey, 1920
- Baris pacta Marshall, 1955
- Baris pallidicornis Boheman, C.H. in Schönherr, C.J., 1836
- Baris palmensis Blatchley, 1928
- Baris parallela Hustache, A., 1938
- Baris parallelicollis Richard, 1956
- Baris parapleura Hustache, A., 1938
- Baris parellina Dejean, 1837
- Baris parumpunctata Fairmaire, L., 1875
- Baris parvidentipes Lea, 1931
- Baris parvonigra Lea, 1927
- Baris parvula Richard, 1956
- Baris pedemontana Desbrochers, J., 1908
- Baris penicillata Hustache, A., 1938
- Baris peninsulae Horn, 1894
- Baris peramoena Reitter, E., 1907
- Baris perdura Reitter, E., 1895
- Baris perlucida Reitter, E., 1901
- Baris perparvula Hustache, 1932
- Baris perrieri Fairmaire, L., 1901
- Baris persimilis Hustache, 1938
- Baris persola Casey, 1920
- Baris pertusa Porta, 1932
- Baris pertusicollis Hustache, A., 1924
- Baris peruensis Hustache, A., 1938
- Baris phlomidis Becker, 1892
- Baris picea Chevrolat L.A.A, 1880
- Baris piceus Stephens, 1829
- Baris picicornis Stephens, J.F., 1839
- Baris picipes Hustache, A., 1938
- Baris picirostris Stephens, J.F., 1831
- Baris picitarsis Hustache, A., 1932
- Baris picturata Ménétriés, 1849
- Baris pililineata Voss, 1965
- Baris pilistriata Stephens, J.F., 1831
- Baris pilitarsis Hustache, 1956
- Baris pilosa Hustache, A., 1938
- Baris planetes Marshall, 1936
- Baris planifera Casey, 1920
- Baris plantarum Hustache, 1936
- Baris polita Dejean,
- Baris polychromus Hustache, A., 1931
- Baris porosa Lea, A.M., 1906
- Baris porosicollis Casey, T.L., 1892
- Baris porosterna Lea, 1931
- Baris portulacae Marshall, 1916
- Baris praeambula Faust, J., 1897
- Baris praemorsa Lea, 1927
- Baris prasina Portevin, G., 1935
- Baris prasinella Hustache, A., 1938
- Baris probata Casey, 1920
- Baris prodita Champion, G.C., 1909
- Baris profuga Casey, 1920
- Baris propinqua Desbrochers, J., 1900
- Baris pruinina Fall, H.C., 1913
- Baris pruinosa LeConte, J.L., 1876
- Baris przewalskyi Zaslavskij, 1956
- Baris pubescens Uhler, 1855
- Baris pulchella Wagner, H. in Calwer, 1913
- Baris pulchriparva Lea, 1927
- Baris pulchripennis Lea, 1927
- Baris pullus Dejean, 1837
- Baris pumila Klug,
- Baris punctata Kol., 1859
- Baris puncticollis Dejean, 1837
- Baris punctimedia Lea, 1931
- Baris punctirostris Champion, G.C., 1909
- Baris punctivaria Lea, 1931
- Baris punctiventris Casey, T.L., 1892
- Baris pupilla Casey, 1920
- Baris purpurea Reitter, E., 1906
- Baris pusilla Hustache, 1939
- Baris pusiola Faust, J., 1895
- Baris pygidialis Hustache, 1951
- Baris pyrenaica Hoffmann, 1933
- Baris quadrata Richard, 1956
- Baris quadraticollis Portevin, G., 1935
- Baris quadratipennis Champion, G.C., 1909
- Baris quadriguttata Dejean,
- Baris quadrillum Fairmaire, L., 1897
- Baris quadrimaculata Dejean,
- Baris quadrinotata Hustache, A., 1938
- Baris quadrinotula Hustache, A., 1938
- Baris quadrisignata Hustache, A., 1938
- Baris quadrivittata Hustache, A., 1938
- Baris quinquemaculata Faust, J., 1894
- Baris raisae Korotyaev, 1987
- Baris recta Marshall, 1955
- Baris rectirostris Faust, J., 1892
- Baris reflexa Hustache, 1951
- Baris regularis Champion, G.C., 1909
- Baris reini Roelofs, W., 1879
- Baris relicta Marshall, G.A.K., 1930
- Baris renardi Faust, J., 1882
- Baris repandirostris Zaslavskij, 1956
- Baris repetita Hustache, A., 1938
- Baris reptis Casey, 1920
- Baris resedae Bach, 1856
- Baris retrusa Casey, 1920
- Baris rhagodiae Rheinheimer, 1992
- Baris rhomboidalis Hustache, 1956
- Baris riftensis Hustache, 1929
- Baris rostrina Casey, 1920
- Baris rotroui Peyerimhoff, 1949
- Baris rotundicollis Champion, G.C., 1909
- Baris rubicundula Champion, G.C., 1909
- Baris rubiginosa Hustache, 1956
- Baris rubricata Hustache, A., 1921
- Baris rubricollis Hustache, 1951
- Baris rubripes Hustache, 1924
- Baris rubrithorax Hustache, 1928
- Baris rudis Dejean, 1837
- Baris rufa Schneider, 1828
- Baris rufescens Solari, F., 1904
- Baris ruficollis Dejean, 1837
- Baris rufitarsis Reitter, E., 1895
- Baris rufoapicata Hustache, A., 1933
- Baris rufula Hustache, A., 1936
- Baris rugosissima Champion, G.C., 1909
- Baris rugulipennis Reitter, E., 1895
- Baris rustica Hustache, 1951
- Baris rusticula Casey, 1920
- Baris ruteri Ferragu, 1962
- Baris saba Dejean, 1837
- Baris saccharivora Matsumura, 1911
- Baris saeva Faust, J., 1898
- Baris sangaense Hustache, 1939
- Baris santafea Hustache, 1951
- Baris sareptana Desbrochers, J., 1900
- Baris satelles Casey, 1920
- Baris schoutedeni Hustache, 1924
- Baris schwarzenbergi Kirsch, T., 1880
- Baris scintillans Casey, T.L., 1892
- Baris scissa Chevrolat L.A.A, 1880
- Baris scotina Hustache, A., 1938
- Baris scrobicollis Dejean, 1837
- Baris sculptilis Gerstaecker, [C.E.] A., 1871
- Baris sculptiventris Casey, 1920
- Baris sculpturata Hustache, 1936
- Baris scutellata Sturm, 1826
- Baris scutellum-album Say, T., 1817
- Baris sedula Faust, J., 1899
- Baris sejuncta Casey, 1920
- Baris sellata Wollaston, T.V., 1865
- Baris seminola Blatchley, 1928
- Baris semiopaca Reitter, E., 1895
- Baris semipunctata Lea, A.M., 1931
- Baris semirubra Bedel, 1914
- Baris semistriata Reitter, E., 1895
- Baris senegalensis Hustache, A., 1932
- Baris senilis Klug,
- Baris separata Casey, 1920
- Baris septemguttata Hustache, A., 1938
- Baris serbica Schultze, W., 1897
- Baris seriatosetosa Solari, F., 1906
- Baris seriepunctata Hustache, A., 1938
- Baris serraticollis Hustache, 1923
- Baris setipennis Lea, 1927
- Baris setistriata Lea, 1927
- Baris setosella Solari, F., 1906
- Baris sexcarinata Faust, J., 18896
- Baris seychellensis Champion, 1914
- Baris shaowuensis Voss, E., 1953
- Baris shirozui Morimoto, 1965
- Baris sibirica Faust, J., 1890
- Baris sicardi Hustache, 1933
- Baris siciliensis Desbrochers, J., 1892
- Baris sicula Hustache, A., 1932
- Baris signata Hustache, A., 1938
- Baris signatula Dejean, 1837
- Baris signatus Marshall, 1930
- Baris silacea Hustache, 1934
- Baris simplicipennis Lea, 1931
- Baris sinapis Normand, H., 1937
- Baris singularis Faust, J., 1892
- Baris sinuatipennis Hustache, 1938
- Baris sionilli Hustache, A., 1938
- Baris smaragdina Hustache, A., 1938
- Baris socialis Casey, T.L., 1892
- Baris soluta Casey, T.L., 1892
- Baris soricina Reitter, E., 1895
- Baris sororia Lea, A.M., 1906
- Baris spadicedoidea Hustache, 1951
- Baris spadiceus Dejean, 1837
- Baris sparsa Casey, T.L., 1892
- Baris speciosa Gerstaecker, [C.E.] A., 1871
- Baris speculifera Faust, J., 1894
- Baris spissirostris Champion, G.C., 1909
- Baris spitzyi Reitter, E., 1895
- Baris splendens Casey, T.L., 1892
- Baris spoliata Portevin, G., 1935
- Baris squamifera Hustache, A., 1938
- Baris squamiger Hustache, A., 1938
- Baris squamosa Dejean, 1837
- Baris squamulata Pic, M., 1896
- Baris squamulosa Dejean, 1837
- Baris squarrosa Hustache, A., 1938
- Baris stacesmithi Sleeper, 1955
- Baris steeleae Marshall, 1942
- Baris steppensis Roubal, 1935
- Baris stictoptera Lea, 1931
- Baris stierlini Tournier, H., 1873
- Baris strenua Champion, G.C., 1909
- Baris striata Blatchley, W.S. & Leng, C.W., 1916
- Baris striaticollis Heller, K.M., 1901
- Baris striatopunctata Reitter, E., 1895
- Baris stricticollis Desbrochers, J., 1892
- Baris striolata Aurivillius, C., 1892
- Baris subaenea Kirsch, T., 1875
- Baris subalbum Ramesha & Ramamurthy, 2011
- Baris subanalis Pic, M., 1900
- Baris subcurvata Zaslavskij, 1956
- Baris subcylindrica Casey, 1920
- Baris subexilis Casey, 1920
- Baris subferruginea Reitter, 1910
- Baris subimpressa Hustache, 1939
- Baris sublaminata Lea, A.M., 1906
- Baris submonticola Hustache, A., 1938
- Baris subnitida Hustache, A., 1938
- Baris subopaca Lea, A.M., 1906
- Baris subovalis Casey, T.L., 1892
- Baris subparilis Casey, 1920
- Baris subplanetes Voss, 1960
- Baris subpolita Zaslavskij, 1956
- Baris subrubra Champion, G.C., 1909
- Baris subsimilis Casey, T.L., 1892
- Baris subtarsalis Rey, C., 1893
- Baris subtilina Reitter, E., 1899
- Baris subtropica Casey, 1920
- Baris subulata Hustache, 1924
- Baris suffriani Reitter, E., 1895
- Baris sulcata Reitter, E., 1895
- Baris sulcicollis Hustache, A., 1938
- Baris sulcipennis Eschscholtz,
- Baris surodense Hustache, A., 1928
- Baris surrufa Casey, 1920
- Baris suturata Fairmaire, L., 1901
- Baris syriaca Faust, J., 1897
- Baris tabaci Hustache, A., 1938
- Baris tadzhica Korotyaev, 1987
- Baris tainanica Voss, E., 1932
- Baris t-album Dejean, 1821
- Baris talpa Chevrolat,
- Baris tatjanae Egorov, 1977
- Baris tchadensis Hustache, A., 1928
- Baris tecta Fall, H.C., 1913
- Baris teheranicus Hoffmann, 1956
- Baris tenuicornis Lea, 1931
- Baris tenuipes Lea, 1931
- Baris tenuis Hustache, A., 1938
- Baris tenuistriata Lea, A.M., 1906
- Baris tenuistriatipennis Hustache, A., 1938
- Baris tenuistriga Fairmaire, L., 1901
- Baris teruelensis Hustache, 1927
- Baris tetra Hustache, A., 1938
- Baris texana Fall, H.C., 1913
- Baris thoracica Kirsch, T., 1875
- Baris tigrina Boheman, C.H. in Schönherr, C.J., 1844
- Baris timida Portevin, G., 1935
- Baris tinantae Hustache, 1924
- Baris tombacina Dejean, 1837
- Baris torquata Hustache, A., 1938
- Baris tortilis Champion, G.C., 1909
- Baris traegårdhi Aurivillius, C. in Jägerskiöld, 1905
- Baris trajecta Casey, 1920
- Baris transversa (Say, T., 1832)
- Baris transversicollis Lea, 1915
- Baris trapezicollis Desbrochers, J., 1892
- Baris trichocnemus Lea, A.M., 1931
- Baris trinodata Sturm, 1826
- Baris triplagiata Desbrochers, J., 1892
- Baris trisinuata Lea, 1927
- Baris truncorum Stephens, 1829
- Baris tuckeri Casey, 1920
- Baris tumescens LeConte, J.L., 1873
- Baris tumida Marshall, 1948
- Baris turcica Hustache, A., 1938
- Baris turgaica Zaslavskij, 1956
- Baris uelensis Hustache, 1924
- Baris uinta Casey, 1920
- Baris unca
- Baris uncinata Dejean, 1837
- Baris usambarica Hustache, 1932
- Baris utibilis Hustache, A., 1938
- Baris vadoni Hustache, 1936
- Baris vagans Casey, 1920
- Baris vecors Dejean, 1837
- Baris versicolor Hustache, A., 1938
- Baris vespertina Casey, T.L., 1892
- Baris vestita Klug,
- Baris vianai Hustache, 1939
- Baris vicaria Faust, J., 1896
- Baris vicina Reitter, E., 1895
- Baris viduata Dejean, 1837
- Baris vigilans Lea, 1931
- Baris villae Comolli, 1837
- Baris violacea Grimmer, K.H.B., 1841
- Baris violaceoamethystina Hustache, 1951
- Baris violaceomicans Solari, F., 1904
- Baris virens
- Baris virescens Brullé, G.A., 1864
- Baris virgatoides Voss, E., 1932
- Baris virginica Casey, 1920
- Baris viridana Dejean, 1837
- Baris viridipennis Rosenhauer, 1856
- Baris viridis Sturm, 1826
- Baris viridisericea
- Baris viridissima Dejean,
- Baris viridus
- Baris vitiensis Lea, 1931
- Baris vitreola Casey, T.L., 1892
- Baris vivax Dejean, 1837
- Baris volgensis Zaslavskij, 1956
- Baris v-signum Voss, 1937
- Baris vulnerata Lea, 1927
- Baris wahlbergi Hustache, A., 1938
- Baris x-album Faust, J., 1898
- Baris xanthii Pierce, W.D., 1907
- Baris x-littera Hustache, A., 1938
- Baris x-signum Reitter, E., 1895
- Baris yunnanica Voss, E., 1932
- Baris yvonae Pic, M., 1909
- Baris zapotensis Champion, G.C., 1909
- Baris zarudnyi Zaslavskij, 1956
- Baris zuniana Casey, T.L., 1892
- † Baris cremastorhynchoides Wickham, H.F., 1913
- † Baris florissantensis Wickham, H.F., 1913
- † Baris hoveyi Wickham, H.F., 1912
- † Baris palaeophila Cockerell, T.D.A., 1920
- † Baris primalis Wickham, H.F., 1917
- † Baris schucherti Wickham, H.F., 1912
