= Oopterinus distinctus =

Scientific classification
- Kingdom: Animalia
- Phylum: Arthropoda
- Class: Insecta
- Order: Coleoptera
- Suborder: Polyphaga
- Infraorder: Cucujiformia
- Family: Curculionidae
- Subfamily: Curculioninae
- Tribe: Otidocephalini
- Genus: Oopterinus
- Species: O. distinctus

Binomial name
- Oopterinus distinctus O'Brien, 1985

Species of beetle

Oopterinus distinctus is a species of weevil in the family Curculionidae, in the order Coleoptera. It was first recorded only within four counties in Arkansas when discovered in 1985, but has since been identified in additional counties in Arkansas as well as Louisiana and Alabama as of 2016.
