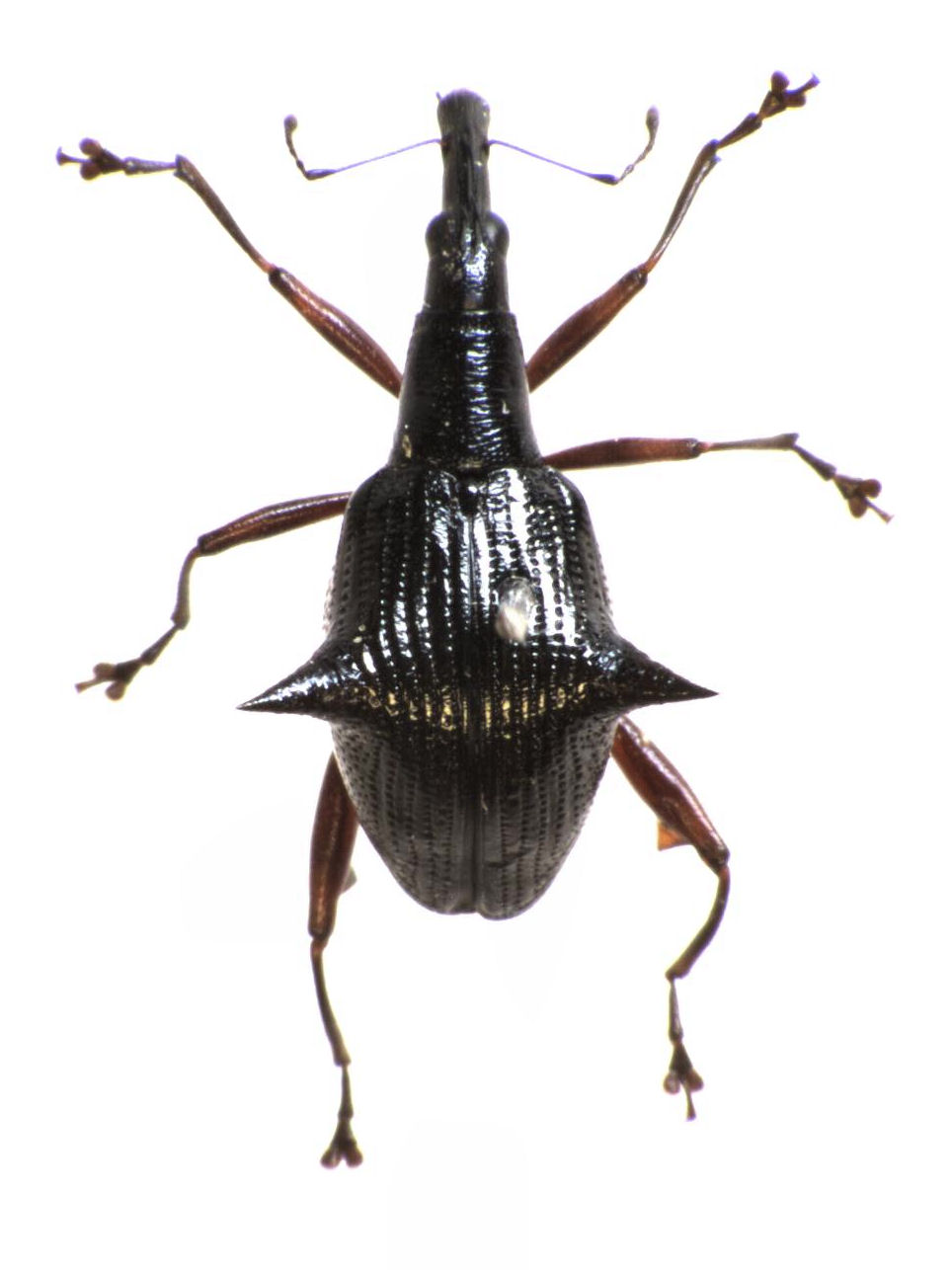
- Nyxetes bidens

Scientific classification
- Kingdom: Animalia
- Phylum: Arthropoda
- Class: Insecta
- Order: Coleoptera
- Suborder: Polyphaga
- Infraorder: Cucujiformia
- Family: Curculionidae
- Genus: Nyxetes; Pascoe, 1870

= Nyxetes =

Genus of beetles

Nyxetes is a genus of true weevils, belonging to the tribe Eugnomini. There is a single species, Nyxetes bidens, which is endemic to New Zealand.

== Biology ==
This species apparently is an obligate associate of certain mealybug species, with the weevil larvae feeding on "a black fungoid substance" that appears at the mealybug feeding sites, eventually forming a subspherical, gall-like cavity inhabited by one weevil larva and multiple mealybugs.
