= Myrmex texanus =

Scientific classification
- Kingdom: Animalia
- Phylum: Arthropoda
- Class: Insecta
- Order: Coleoptera
- Suborder: Polyphaga
- Infraorder: Cucujiformia
- Family: Curculionidae
- Genus: Myrmex
- Species: M. texanus

Binomial name
- Myrmex texanus (Schaeffer, 1907)

Species of beetle

Myrmex texanus is a species of antlike weevil in the beetle family Curculionidae. It is found in North America.
