= Barinus suffusus =

Scientific classification
- Kingdom: Animalia
- Phylum: Arthropoda
- Class: Insecta
- Order: Coleoptera
- Suborder: Polyphaga
- Infraorder: Cucujiformia
- Family: Curculionidae
- Genus: Barinus
- Species: B. suffusus

Binomial name
- Barinus suffusus Casey, 1892

Species of beetle

Barinus suffusus is a species of flower weevil in the beetle family Curculionidae. It is found in North America.
