= Barinus =

Scientific classification
- Domain: Eukaryota
- Kingdom: Animalia
- Phylum: Arthropoda
- Class: Insecta
- Order: Coleoptera
- Suborder: Polyphaga
- Infraorder: Cucujiformia
- Family: Curculionidae
- Genus: Barinus; Casey, 1887

Genus of beetles

Barinus is a genus of flower weevils in the family Curculionidae. There are about 14 described species in Barinus.

== Species ==
- Barinus albescens (LeConte, 1880)
- Barinus bivittatus (LeConte, 1878)
- Barinus confusus Sleeper, 1956
- Barinus convexicollis Sleeper, 1956
- Barinus cribricollis (LeConte, 1876)
- Barinus curticollis Casey, 1892
- Barinus debilis Casey, 1920
- Barinus difficilis Casey, 1892
- Barinus elusus Blatchley, 1920
- Barinus linearis (LeConte, 1876)
- Barinus lutescens (LeConte, 1880)
- Barinus productus (Casey, 1920)
- Barinus robustus (Blatchley, 1920)
- Barinus suffusus Casey, 1892
