= Centrinaspis elegans =

Scientific classification
- Kingdom: Animalia
- Phylum: Arthropoda
- Class: Insecta
- Order: Coleoptera
- Suborder: Polyphaga
- Infraorder: Cucujiformia
- Family: Curculionidae
- Genus: Centrinaspis
- Species: C. elegans

Binomial name
- Centrinaspis elegans Casey, 1922

Species of beetle

Centrinaspis elegans is a species of true weevils in the subfamily Curculioninae. It is found in Brazil. The type specimen was collected in Chapada Campo.
