= Baris umbilicata =

Scientific classification
- Domain: Eukaryota
- Kingdom: Animalia
- Phylum: Arthropoda
- Class: Insecta
- Order: Coleoptera
- Suborder: Polyphaga
- Infraorder: Cucujiformia
- Family: Curculionidae
- Genus: Baris
- Species: B. umbilicata

Binomial name
- Baris umbilicata (LeConte, 1858)

Species of beetle

Baris umbilicata is a species of flower weevil in the beetle family Curculionidae. It is found in North America.
