= Barinus linearis =

Scientific classification
- Kingdom: Animalia
- Phylum: Arthropoda
- Clade: Pancrustacea
- Class: Insecta
- Order: Coleoptera
- Suborder: Polyphaga
- Infraorder: Cucujiformia
- Family: Curculionidae
- Genus: Barinus
- Species: B. linearis

Binomial name
- Barinus linearis (LeConte, 1876)

Species of beetle

Barinus linearis is a species of flower weevil in the beetle family Curculionidae. It is found in North America. It was first described by W.S. Blatchley and C.W. Leng in 1916.
