= Barinus curticollis =

Scientific classification
- Kingdom: Animalia
- Phylum: Arthropoda
- Class: Insecta
- Order: Coleoptera
- Suborder: Polyphaga
- Infraorder: Cucujiformia
- Family: Curculionidae
- Genus: Barinus
- Species: B. curticollis

Binomial name
- Barinus curticollis Casey, 1892

Synonyms
- Barinus ferruginosus Casey, 1920

Species of beetle

Barinus curticollis is a species of flower weevil in the beetle family Curculionidae. It is found in North America.
