= Kuschelysius =

Scientific classification
- Domain: Eukaryota
- Kingdom: Animalia
- Phylum: Arthropoda
- Class: Insecta
- Order: Coleoptera
- Suborder: Polyphaga
- Infraorder: Cucujiformia
- Family: Curculionidae
- Tribe: Eugnomini
- Genus: Kuschelysius

Genus of beetles

Kuschelysius is a genus of true weevils, belonging to the tribe Eugnomini, endemic to the South Island of New Zealand. Four species have been described.
