= Oopterinus =

Scientific classification
- Kingdom: Animalia
- Phylum: Arthropoda
- Class: Insecta
- Order: Coleoptera
- Suborder: Polyphaga
- Infraorder: Cucujiformia
- Family: Curculionidae
- Subfamily: Curculioninae
- Tribe: Otidocephalini
- Genus: Oopterinus; Casey, 1892

Genus of beetles

Oopterinus is a genus of antlike weevils in the beetle family Curculionidae. There are about 12 described species in Oopterinus.

== Species ==
These 12 species belong to the genus Oopterinus:

- Oopterinus aeneopiceus Champion, G.C., 1902
- Oopterinus bactrianus Champion, G.C., 1902
- Oopterinus castaneipennis Champion, G.C., 1902
- Oopterinus championi Sleeper, 1954
- Oopterinus convexipennis Sleeper, 1954
- Oopterinus distinctus O'Brien, 1985
- Oopterinus gibbipennis Champion, G.C., 1902
- Oopterinus glabratus Champion, G.C., 1902
- Oopterinus iowaensis Sleeper, 1953
- Oopterinus laevigatus Champion, G.C., 1902
- Oopterinus perforatus (Horn, 1873)
- Oopterinus piliferus Champion, G.C., 1902
