= Barinus lutescens =

Scientific classification
- Kingdom: Animalia
- Phylum: Arthropoda
- Class: Insecta
- Order: Coleoptera
- Suborder: Polyphaga
- Infraorder: Cucujiformia
- Family: Curculionidae
- Genus: Barinus
- Species: B. lutescens

Binomial name
- Barinus lutescens (LeConte, 1880)

Species of beetle

Barinus lutescens is a species of flower weevil in the family Curculionidae. It is found in North America.
