= Centrinaspis =

Scientific classification
- Kingdom: Animalia
- Phylum: Arthropoda
- Clade: Pancrustacea
- Class: Insecta
- Order: Coleoptera
- Suborder: Polyphaga
- Infraorder: Cucujiformia
- Family: Curculionidae
- Subfamily: Curculioninae
- Genus: Centrinaspis; Casey, 1920

Species
- about 266, including: Centrinaspis capillatus; Centrinaspis elegans; Centrinaspis penicellus

Genus of beetles

Centrinaspis is a genus of true Weevils in the subfamily Curculioninae. Species are found in the Americas.
