= Barinus cribricollis =

Scientific classification
- Kingdom: Animalia
- Phylum: Arthropoda
- Class: Insecta
- Order: Coleoptera
- Suborder: Polyphaga
- Infraorder: Cucujiformia
- Family: Curculionidae
- Genus: Barinus
- Species: B. cribricollis

Binomial name
- Barinus cribricollis (LeConte, 1876)

Synonyms
- Barinus squamolineatus Casey, 1887

Species of beetle

Barinus cribricollis is a species of flower weevil in the beetle family Curculionidae.
