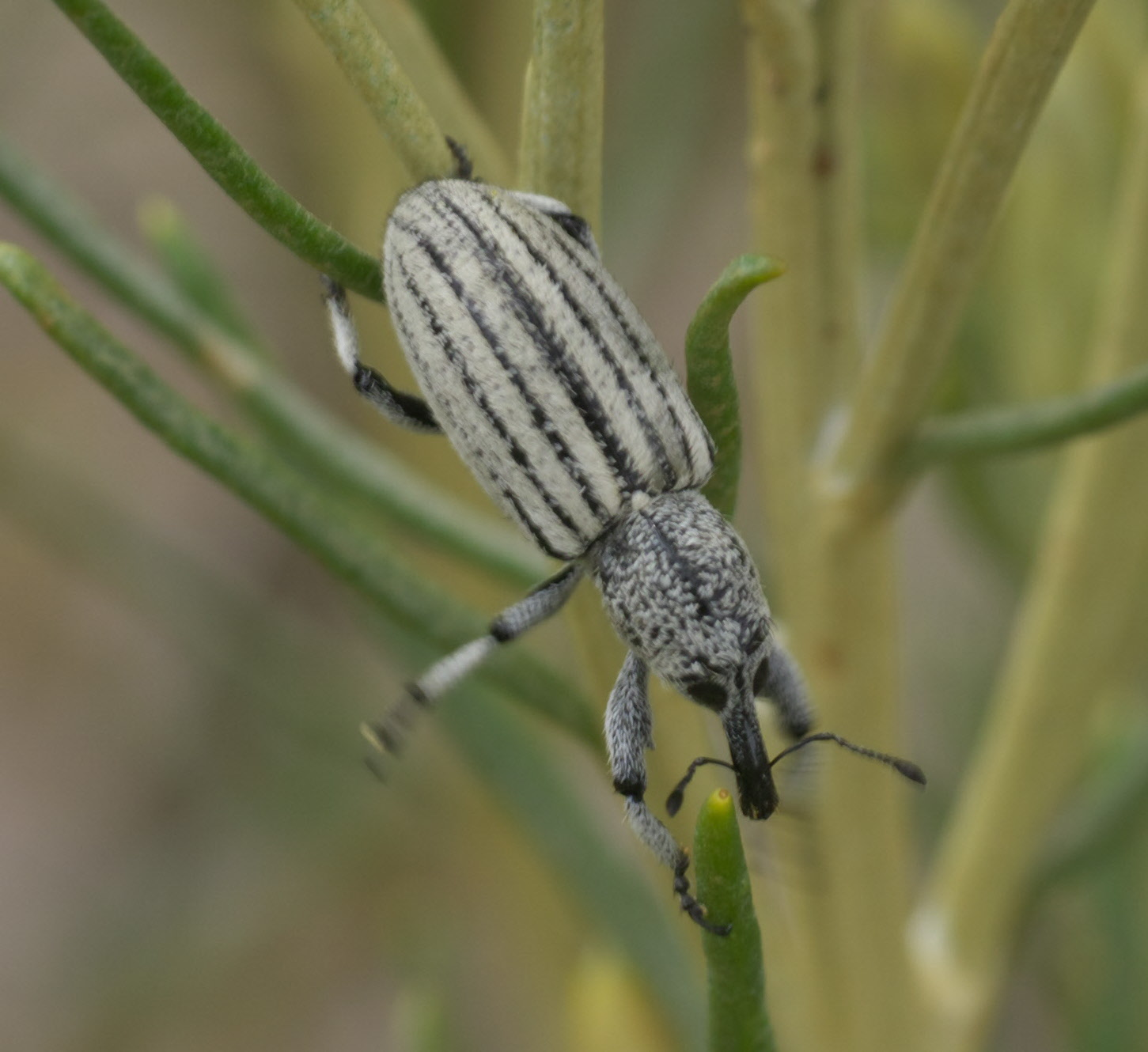

Scientific classification
- Domain: Eukaryota
- Kingdom: Animalia
- Phylum: Arthropoda
- Class: Insecta
- Order: Coleoptera
- Suborder: Polyphaga
- Infraorder: Cucujiformia
- Family: Curculionidae
- Genus: Myrmex
- Species: M. lineatus

Binomial name
- Myrmex lineatus (Pascoe, 1872)

Synonyms
- Myrmex knowltoni Sleeper, 1953; Otidocephalus nivosus Casey, 1892; Otidocephalus vittatus Horn, 1873

= Myrmex lineatus =

Species of beetle

Myrmex lineatus is a species of antlike weevil in the beetle family Curculionidae. It is found in North America.

== Subspecies ==
These two subspecies belong to the species Myrmex lineatus:

- Myrmex lineata knowltoni Sleeper
- Myrmex lineata lineata
