= Baris rubripes =

Scientific classification
- Kingdom: Animalia
- Phylum: Arthropoda
- Class: Insecta
- Order: Coleoptera
- Suborder: Polyphaga
- Infraorder: Cucujiformia
- Family: Curculionidae
- Genus: Baris
- Species: B. rubripes

Binomial name
- Baris rubripes Casey, 1892

Synonyms
- Baris subcylindrica Casey, 1920; Baris trajecta Casey, 1920

Species of beetle

Baris rubripes is a species of flower weevil in the beetle family Curculionidae.
