= Myrmex myrmex =

Scientific classification
- Kingdom: Animalia
- Phylum: Arthropoda
- Class: Insecta
- Order: Coleoptera
- Suborder: Polyphaga
- Infraorder: Cucujiformia
- Family: Curculionidae
- Genus: Myrmex
- Species: M. myrmex

Binomial name
- Myrmex myrmex (Herbst, 1797)

Synonyms
- Erodiscus myrmecodes Say, 1831; Myrmex herbstii Sturm, 1826; Otiocephalus americanus Chevrolat, 1832

Species of beetle

Myrmex myrmex is a species of antlike weevil in the beetle family Curculionidae. It is found in North America. It develops in dead and dying American sycamore wood.
