= Myrmex egregius =

Scientific classification
- Kingdom: Animalia
- Phylum: Arthropoda
- Class: Insecta
- Order: Coleoptera
- Suborder: Polyphaga
- Infraorder: Cucujiformia
- Family: Curculionidae
- Genus: Myrmex
- Species: M. egregius

Binomial name
- Myrmex egregius (Casey, 1892)

Species of beetle

Myrmex egregius is a species of antlike weevil in the beetle family Curculionidae. It is found in North America.
