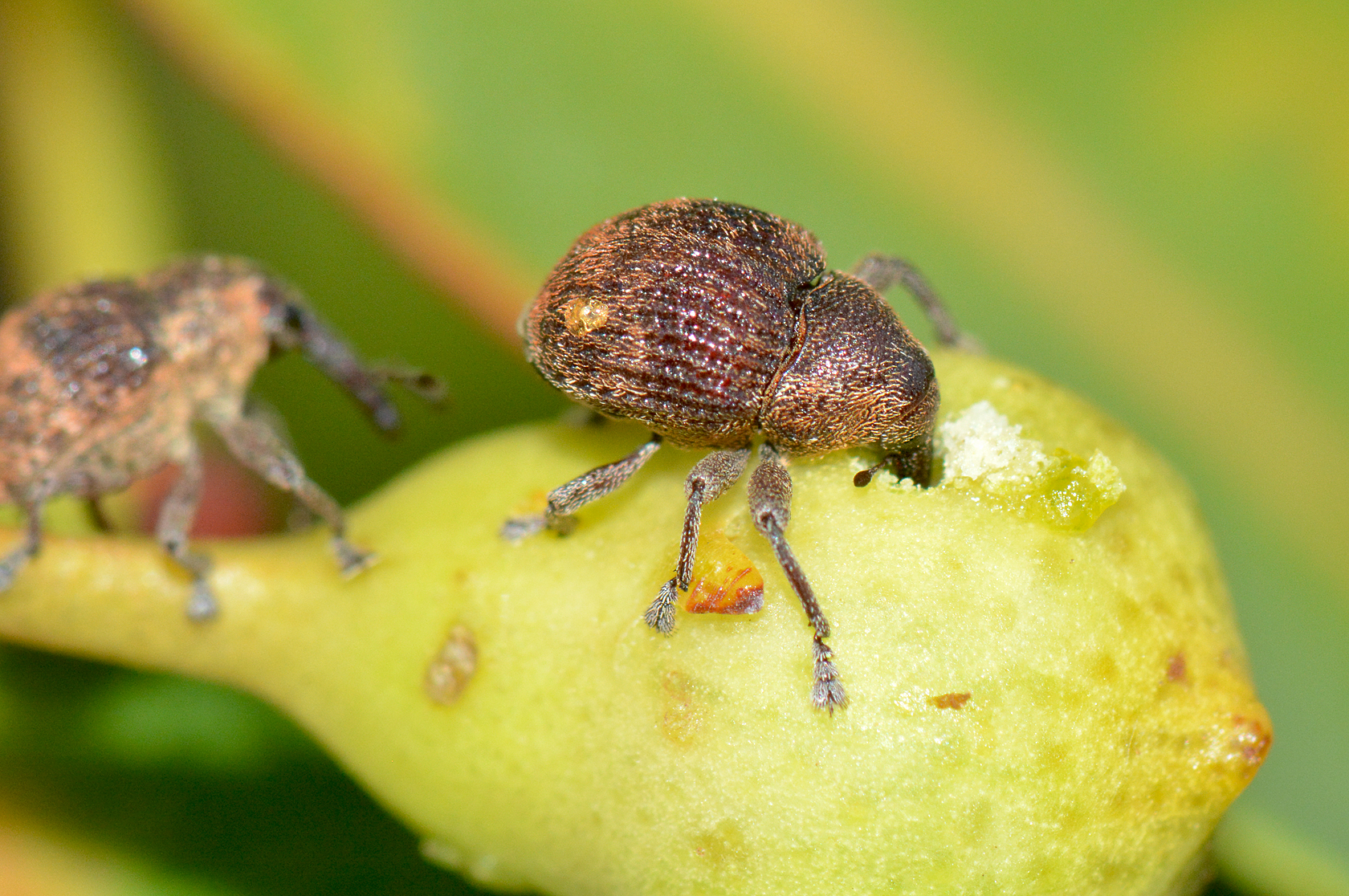
- Cryptoplini on red gum flower bud

Scientific classification
- Domain: Eukaryota
- Kingdom: Animalia
- Phylum: Arthropoda
- Class: Insecta
- Order: Coleoptera
- Suborder: Polyphaga
- Infraorder: Cucujiformia
- Family: Curculionidae
- Subfamily: Curculioninae
- Tribe: Cryptoplini; Lacordaire, 1863

= Cryptoplini =

Tribe of weevils

Cryptoplini is a tribe of weevils in the subfamily Curculioninae. It occurs mostly in Australia with one species in New Guinea.

== Description ==
In adults of Cryptoplini, the pronotum and elytra are densely covered in scales, and the elytra are uniformly convex from base to apex. The rostrum is usually stout and relatively straight (long, thin and distinctly curved in Zeopus). The maxillary palps and labial palps are 3-segmented. The antennae have funicles 6- or 7-segmented and clubs 4- or 5-segmented, and the clubs are elongate. The procoxae are narrowly separate to contiguous (Zeopus). The femora have one or more unequal teeth. The tibiae have a large uncus and a smaller premucro inside a tuft of setae. The tarsi have the onychium (terminal segment that bears a claw) narrow or reduced to absent. The tarsal claws are simple and either connate, single or absent. The proventriculus (part of the digestive system) is undifferentiated, lacking plates and paired brushes. In males, the penis has the tectal plate fused with the pedon at the base. In females, the gonocoxites are without styli, and the spermathecal gland has a sclerotised funnel-shaped base.

== Ecology ==
Cryptoplini are herbivores and mostly associated with plants in the family Myrtaceae.

Cryptoplus, Haplonyx, Sigastus and Zeopus mainly use Eucalyptus as hosts. Their larvae can develop in flower and fruit buds, or in galls (often galls already formed by other insects). Some Haplonyx species use Melaleuca, Leptospermum or Casuarina (Casuarinaceae) as hosts.

Menechirus use fruits of Syzygium and possibly also Rhodomyrtus macrocarpa.

Kuschelorhynchus macadamiae uses fruits of Macadamia (Proteaceae) and is a pest of macadamia plantations.

== Genera ==
The genera of Cryptoplini are:

- Cryptoplus Erichson, 1842
- Haplonyx Schoenherr, 1836
- Kuschelorhynchus Jennings & Oberprieler, 2018
- Menechirus Hartmann, 1901
- Sigastus Pascoe, 1865
- Zeopus Pascoe, 1872
