= Baris transversa =

Scientific classification
- Domain: Eukaryota
- Kingdom: Animalia
- Phylum: Arthropoda
- Class: Insecta
- Order: Coleoptera
- Suborder: Polyphaga
- Infraorder: Cucujiformia
- Family: Curculionidae
- Genus: Baris
- Species: B. transversa

Binomial name
- Baris transversa (Say, 1832)

Synonyms
- Baridius sulcipennis L. Heyden, 1868; Baridius strenuus J. L. LeConte, 1869; Baridius sulcipennis C. Brisout de Barneville, 1870; Baris coloradensis Casey, 1920; Baris formalis Casey, 1920; Baris longulicollis Casey, 1920; Baris montanica Casey, 1920; Baris satelles Casey, 1920; Baris separata Casey, 1920; Baris subparilis Casey, 1920; Baris uinta Casey, 1920

Species of beetle

Baris transversa is a species of flower weevil in the beetle family Curculionidae. It is found in North America.
