= Myrmex estriatus =

Scientific classification
- Kingdom: Animalia
- Phylum: Arthropoda
- Class: Insecta
- Order: Coleoptera
- Suborder: Polyphaga
- Infraorder: Cucujiformia
- Family: Curculionidae
- Genus: Myrmex
- Species: M. estriatus

Binomial name
- Myrmex estriatus (Casey, 1892)

Species of beetle

Myrmex estriatus is a species of antlike weevil in the beetle family Curculionidae.
