= Baris grossacavis =

Baris grossacavis Temporal range: Late Pleistocene-Holocene

Scientific classification
- Kingdom: Animalia
- Phylum: Arthropoda
- Class: Insecta
- Order: Coleoptera
- Suborder: Polyphaga
- Infraorder: Cucujiformia
- Family: Curculionidae
- Genus: Baris
- Species: B. grossacavis

Binomial name
- Baris grossacavis Poinar and Legalov, 2015

Species of beetle

Baris grossacavis is a species of extinct beetle in the genus Baris of the family Curculionidae.

== See also ==
- 2015 in beetle paleontology
