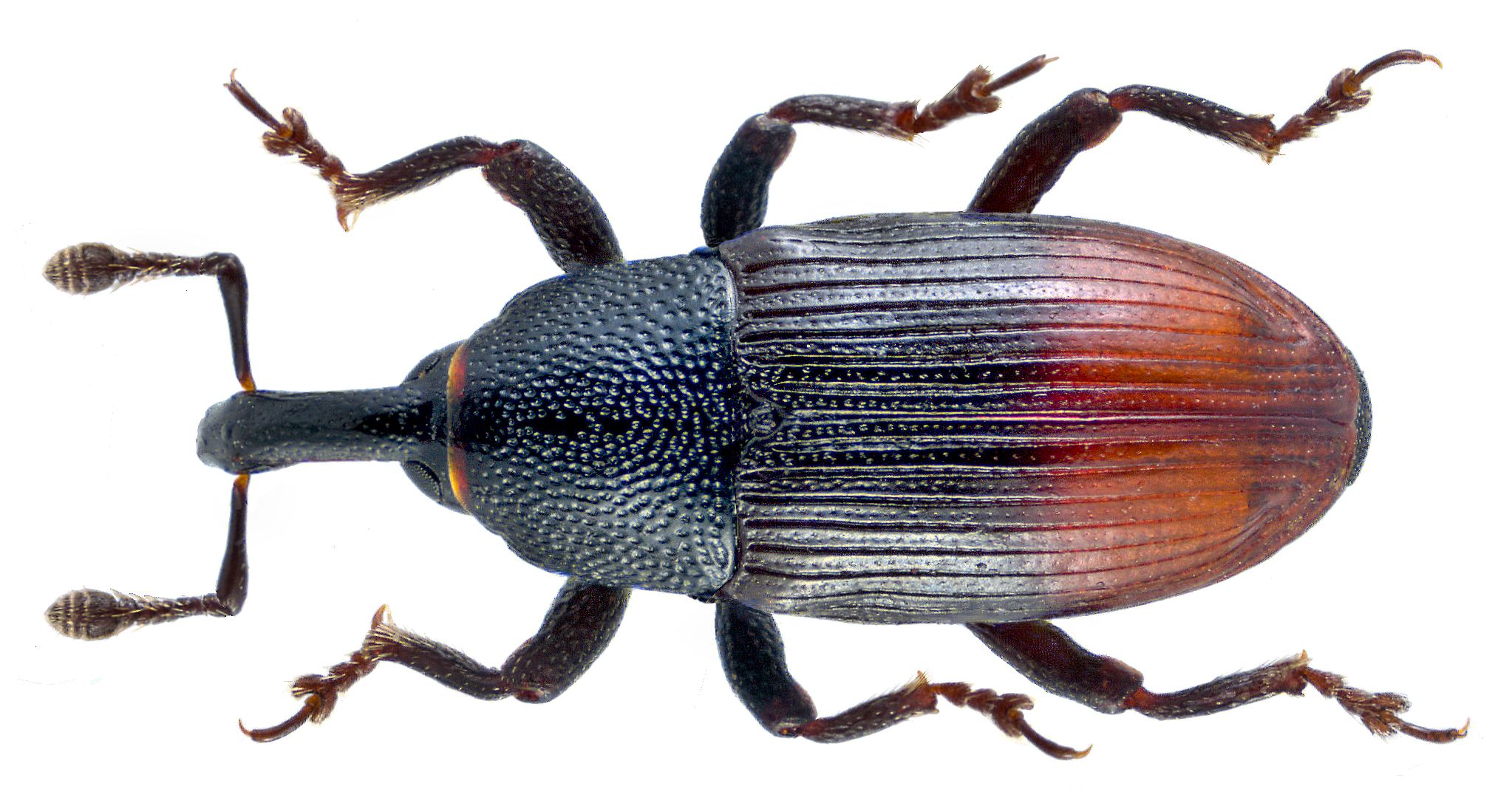
- Baris analis

Scientific classification
- Kingdom: Animalia
- Phylum: Arthropoda
- Clade: Pancrustacea
- Class: Insecta
- Order: Coleoptera
- Suborder: Polyphaga
- Infraorder: Cucujiformia
- Family: Curculionidae
- Subfamily: Baridinae
- Tribe: Baridini
- Genus: Baris; Germar, 1817

Species
- See text

= Baris (weevil) =

Genus of beetles

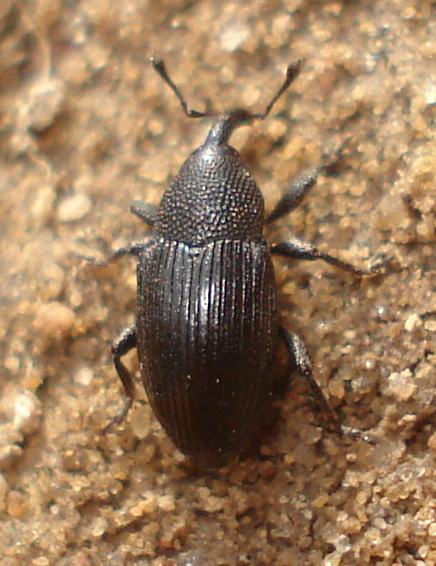
Baris artemisiae

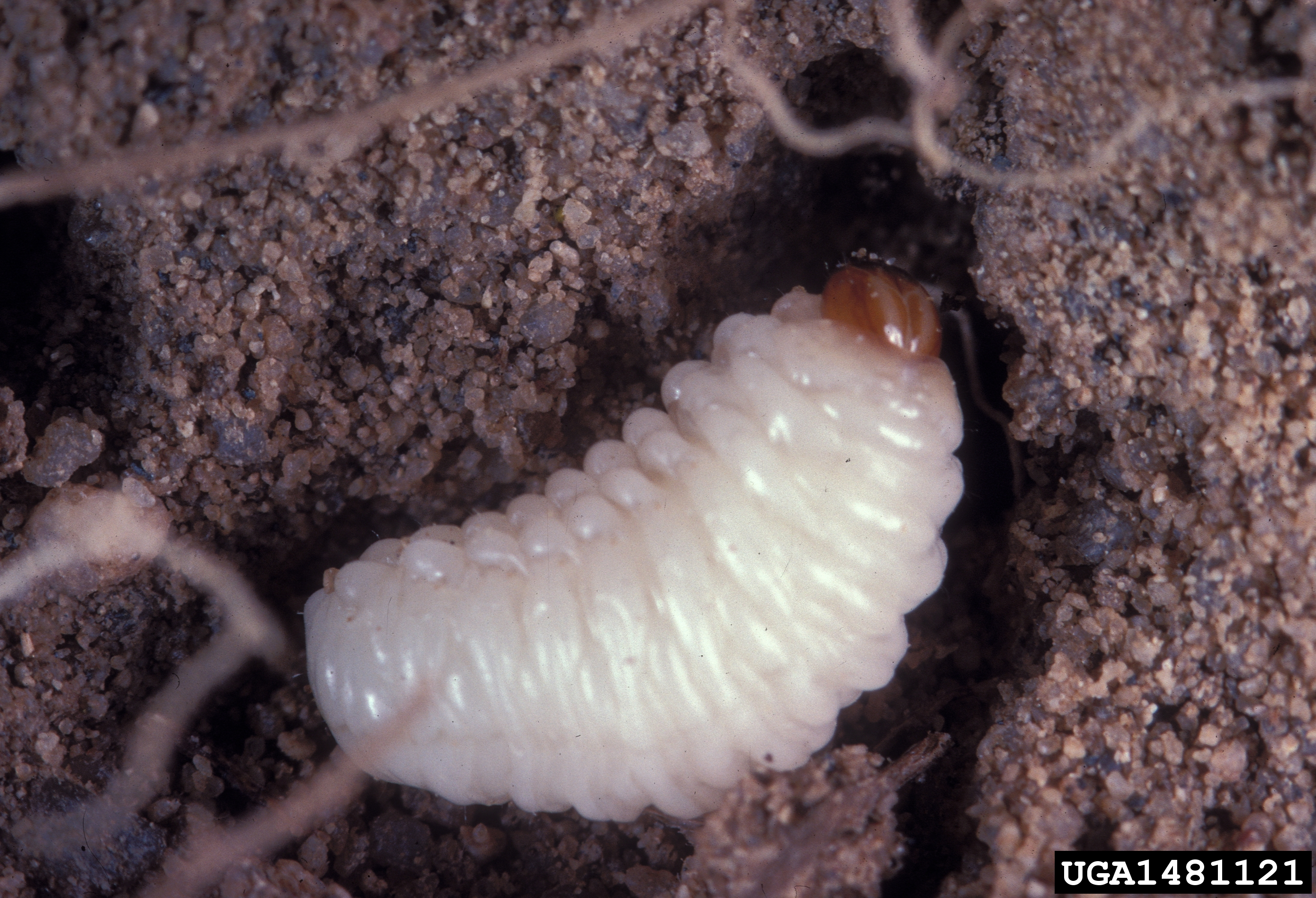
Baris transversa? larva

Baris is a genus of weevils.

== Selected species ==
- Baris abrupta
- Baris aeneomicans
- Baris aerea
- Baris amnicola
- Baris ancilla
- Baris aperta
- Baris arizonica
- Baris ashevillensis
- Baris blatchleyi
- Baris brunneipes
- Baris callida
- Baris canadensis
- Baris carolinensis
- Baris caudalis
- Baris cauta
- Baris cirsii
- Baris columbiana
- Baris confinis
- Baris cruda
- Baris deformis
- Baris denverensis
- Baris dilatata
- Baris discipula
- Baris esuriens
- Baris exigua
- Baris floridensis
- Baris fracta
- Baris futilis
- Baris genitiva
- Baris gravida
- Baris grossacavis
- Baris heterodoxa
- Baris hispidula
- Baris humerosa
- Baris hyperion
- Baris inconspicua
- Baris ingens
- Baris intacta
- Baris interstitialis
- Baris irregularis
- Baris lanosella
- Baris lengi
- Baris lepidii
- Baris macra
- Baris meraca
- Baris metasternalis
- Baris minuens
- Baris mobilensis
- Baris modicella
- Baris monardae
- Baris monticola
- Baris neptis
- Baris nevadica
- Baris nitida
- Baris novella
- Baris obsequens
- Baris opacula
- Baris oviculata
- Baris palmensis
- Baris persola
- Baris porosicollis
- Baris probata
- Baris pruinina
- Baris punctiventris
- Baris pupilla
- Baris rostrina
- Baris rubripes
- Baris rusticula
- Baris scintillans
- Baris sculptiventris
- Baris sejuncta
- Baris seminola
- Baris socialis
- Baris soluta
- Baris sparsa
- Baris splendens
- Baris stacesmithi
- Baris striata
- Baris subexilis
- Baris subovalis
- Baris subsimilis
- Baris subtropica
- Baris tecta
- Baris tenuestriata
- Baris texana
- Baris transversa
- Baris tuckeri
- Baris umbilicata
- Baris vespertina
- Baris virginica
- Baris vitreola
- Baris xanthii

== See also ==
- List of Baris species
