= Myrmex floridanus =

Scientific classification
- Kingdom: Animalia
- Phylum: Arthropoda
- Class: Insecta
- Order: Coleoptera
- Suborder: Polyphaga
- Infraorder: Cucujiformia
- Family: Curculionidae
- Genus: Myrmex
- Species: M. floridanus

Binomial name
- Myrmex floridanus (Casey, 1892)

Species of beetle

Myrmex floridanus is a species of antlike weevil in the family Curculionidae. It is found in North America.
