= Baris heterodoxa =

Scientific classification
- Domain: Eukaryota
- Kingdom: Animalia
- Phylum: Arthropoda
- Class: Insecta
- Order: Coleoptera
- Suborder: Polyphaga
- Infraorder: Cucujiformia
- Family: Curculionidae
- Genus: Baris
- Species: B. heterodoxa

Binomial name
- Baris heterodoxa Fall, 1901

Species of beetle

Baris heterodoxa is a species of flower weevil in the beetle family Curculionidae. It is found in North America.
