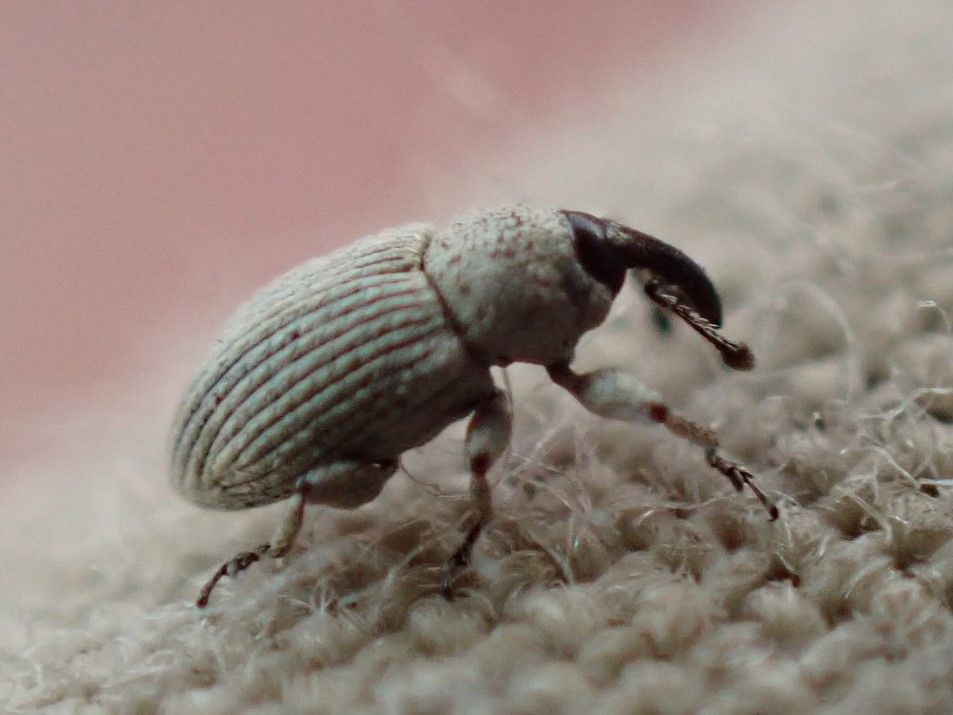

Scientific classification
- Kingdom: Animalia
- Phylum: Arthropoda
- Class: Insecta
- Order: Coleoptera
- Suborder: Polyphaga
- Infraorder: Cucujiformia
- Family: Curculionidae
- Tribe: Smicronychini
- Genus: Promecotarsus; Casey, 1892

= Promecotarsus =

Genus of beetles

Promecotarsus is a genus of true weevils in the beetle family Curculionidae. There are at least three species described in the genus Promecotarsus.

== Species ==
These three species belong to the genus Promecotarsus:

- Promecotarsus densus Casey, 1892
- Promecotarsus fumatus Casey, 1892
- Promecotarsus maritimus Casey, 1892
