= Baris futilis =

Scientific classification
- Kingdom: Animalia
- Phylum: Arthropoda
- Class: Insecta
- Order: Coleoptera
- Suborder: Polyphaga
- Infraorder: Cucujiformia
- Family: Curculionidae
- Genus: Baris
- Species: B. futilis

Binomial name
- Baris futilis Casey, 1892

Species of beetle

Baris futilis is a species of flower weevil in the family of beetles known as Curculionidae. It is found in North America.
