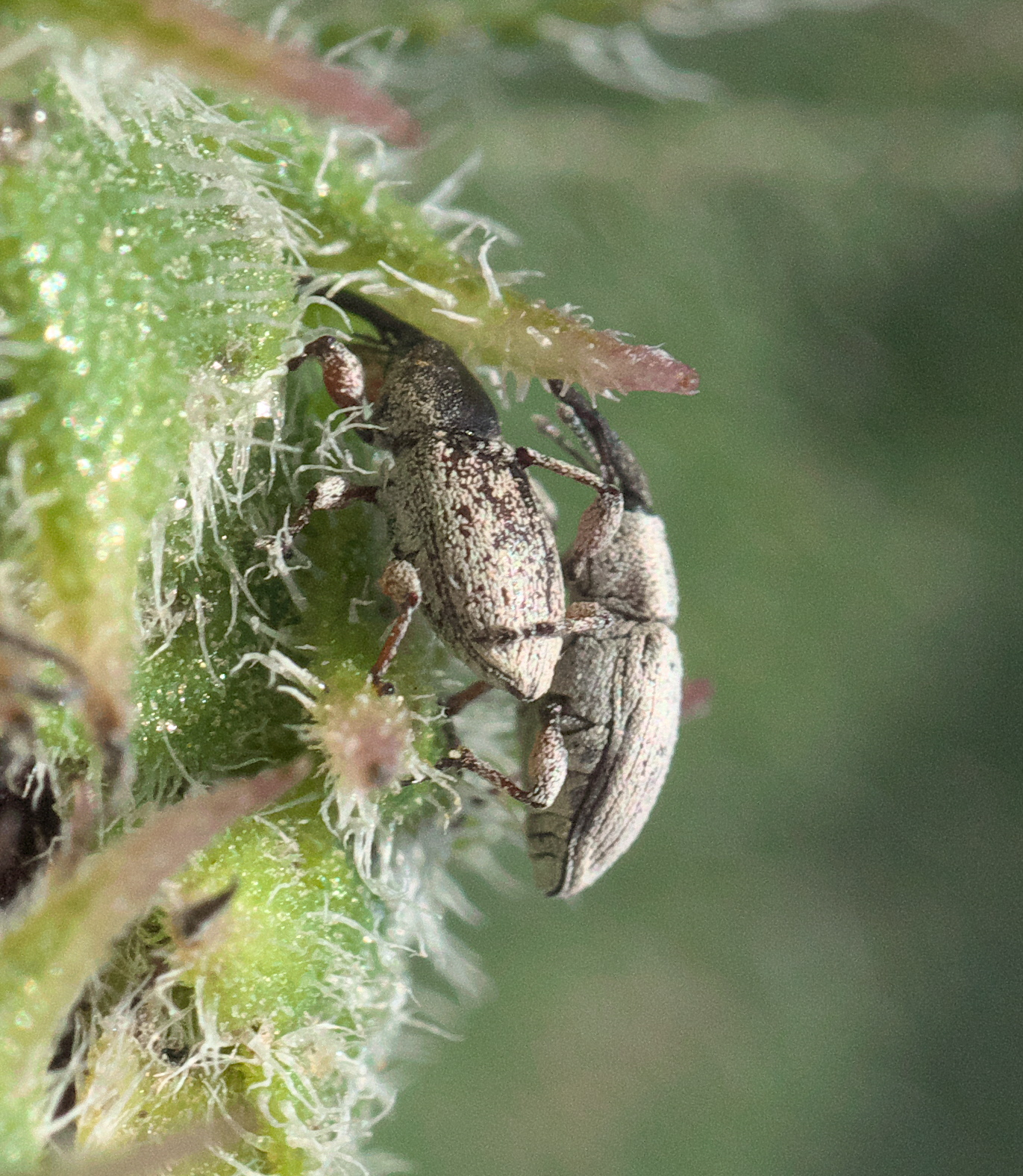
- Smicronyx sordidus

Scientific classification
- Kingdom: Animalia
- Phylum: Arthropoda
- Class: Insecta
- Order: Coleoptera
- Suborder: Polyphaga
- Infraorder: Cucujiformia
- Family: Curculionidae
- Subfamily: Curculioninae
- Tribe: Smicronychini; Seidlitz, 1891

= Smicronychini =

Tribe of beetles

Smicronychini is a tribe of true weevils in the family of beetles known as Curculionidae. There are at least 7 genera in Smicronychini.

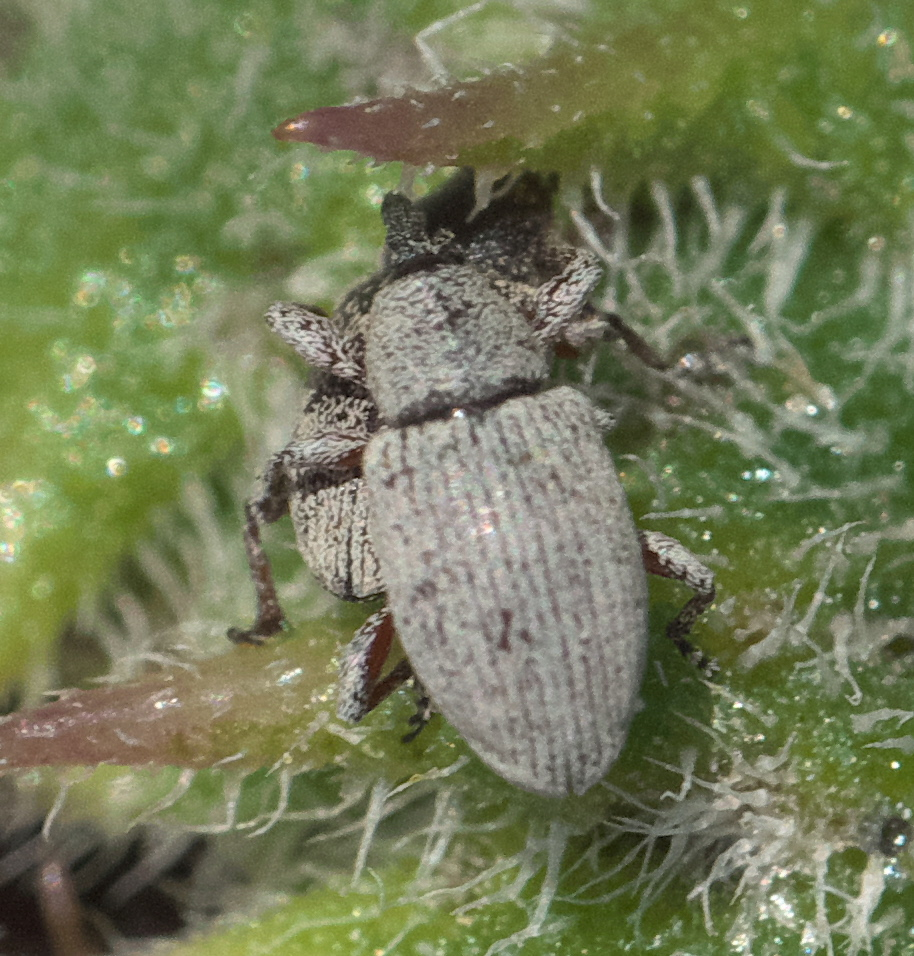
Smicronyx sordidus

== Genera ==
These seven genera belong to the tribe Smicronychini:

- Afrosmicronyx Hustache, 1935^{g}
- Hedychrous Marshall, 1923^{c g}
- Promecotarsus Casey, 1892^{i c g b}
- Sharpia Tournier, 1873^{c g}
- Smicronyx Schönherr, 1843^{i c g b}
- Smicrorhynchus Scudder, 1893^{c g}
- Topelatus Hustache, 1920^{c g}

Data sources: i = ITIS, c = Catalogue of Life, g = GBIF, b = Bugguide.net
