= Myrmex knulli =

Scientific classification
- Domain: Eukaryota
- Kingdom: Animalia
- Phylum: Arthropoda
- Class: Insecta
- Order: Coleoptera
- Suborder: Polyphaga
- Infraorder: Cucujiformia
- Family: Curculionidae
- Genus: Myrmex
- Species: M. knulli

Binomial name
- Myrmex knulli Sleeper, 1954

Synonyms
- Myrmex chiricahuae Sleeper, 1954

Species of beetle

Myrmex knulli is a species of antlike weevil in the beetle family Curculionidae. It is found in North America.

== Subspecies ==
These two subspecies belong to the species Myrmex knulli:

- Myrmex knulli chiricahuae
- Myrmex knulli knulli
