= Promecotarsus densus =

Scientific classification
- Kingdom: Animalia
- Phylum: Arthropoda
- Class: Insecta
- Order: Coleoptera
- Suborder: Polyphaga
- Infraorder: Cucujiformia
- Family: Curculionidae
- Genus: Promecotarsus
- Species: P. densus

Binomial name
- Promecotarsus densus Casey, 1892

Species of beetle

Promecotarsus densus is a species of true weevil in the beetle family Curculionidae. It is found in North America.
