= Baris dilatata =

Scientific classification
- Kingdom: Animalia
- Phylum: Arthropoda
- Class: Insecta
- Order: Coleoptera
- Suborder: Polyphaga
- Infraorder: Cucujiformia
- Family: Curculionidae
- Genus: Baris
- Species: B. dilatata

Binomial name
- Baris dilatata Casey, 1892

Synonyms
- Baris adustula Casey, 1920; Baris coltonensis Casey, 1920; Baris inculta Casey, 1920; Baris matrona Casey, 1920; Baris profuga Casey, 1920

Species of beetle

Baris dilatata is a species of flower weevil in the beetle family Curculionidae. It is found in North America.
