= Oopterinus perforatus =

Scientific classification
- Domain: Eukaryota
- Kingdom: Animalia
- Phylum: Arthropoda
- Class: Insecta
- Order: Coleoptera
- Suborder: Polyphaga
- Infraorder: Cucujiformia
- Family: Curculionidae
- Genus: Oopterinus
- Species: O. perforatus

Binomial name
- Oopterinus perforatus (Horn, 1873)

Synonyms
- Oopterinus iowaensis Sleeper, 1953

Species of beetle

Oopterinus perforatus is a species of antlike weevil in the beetle family Curculionidae. It is found in North America.
