= Baris interstitialis =

Scientific classification
- Domain: Eukaryota
- Kingdom: Animalia
- Phylum: Arthropoda
- Class: Insecta
- Order: Coleoptera
- Suborder: Polyphaga
- Infraorder: Cucujiformia
- Family: Curculionidae
- Genus: Baris
- Species: B. interstitialis

Binomial name
- Baris interstitialis (Say, 1824)

Synonyms
- Baridius carinulatus LeConte, 1858; Baridius quadratus LeConte, 1868; Baridius subaeneus LeConte, 1868; Baridius tumescens LeConte, 1868; Baris agnita Casey, 1920; Baris anaplata Casey, 1920; Baris appalachia Casey, 1920; Baris apposita Casey, 1920; Baris aprica Casey, 1892; Baris apricoides Fall, 1913; Baris attonsa Casey, 1920; Baris austiniana Casey, 1920; Baris bispeculata Casey, 1920; Baris brachyrhina Casey, 1920; Baris brevipennis Casey, 1920; Baris caseyi Hustache, 1938; Baris cribrifera Casey, 1920; Baris cuneipennis Casey, 1892; Baris demissa Casey, 1920; Baris dolosa Casey, 1892; Baris durangoana Champion, 1909; Baris fultoni Casey, 1920; Baris immunis Casey, 1920; Baris irrita Casey, 1920; Baris lavacana Casey, 1920; Baris lubrica Casey, 1892; Baris nephiana Casey, 1920; Baris oblata Casey, 1920; Baris oblongula Casey, 1892; Baris peninsulae Horn, 1894; Baris retrusa Casey, 1920; Baris surrufa Casey, 1920; Baris zuniana Casey, 1892

Species of beetle

Baris interstitialis is a species of flower weevil in the beetle family Curculionidae. It is found in North America. It can be found on Ceanothus americanus.
