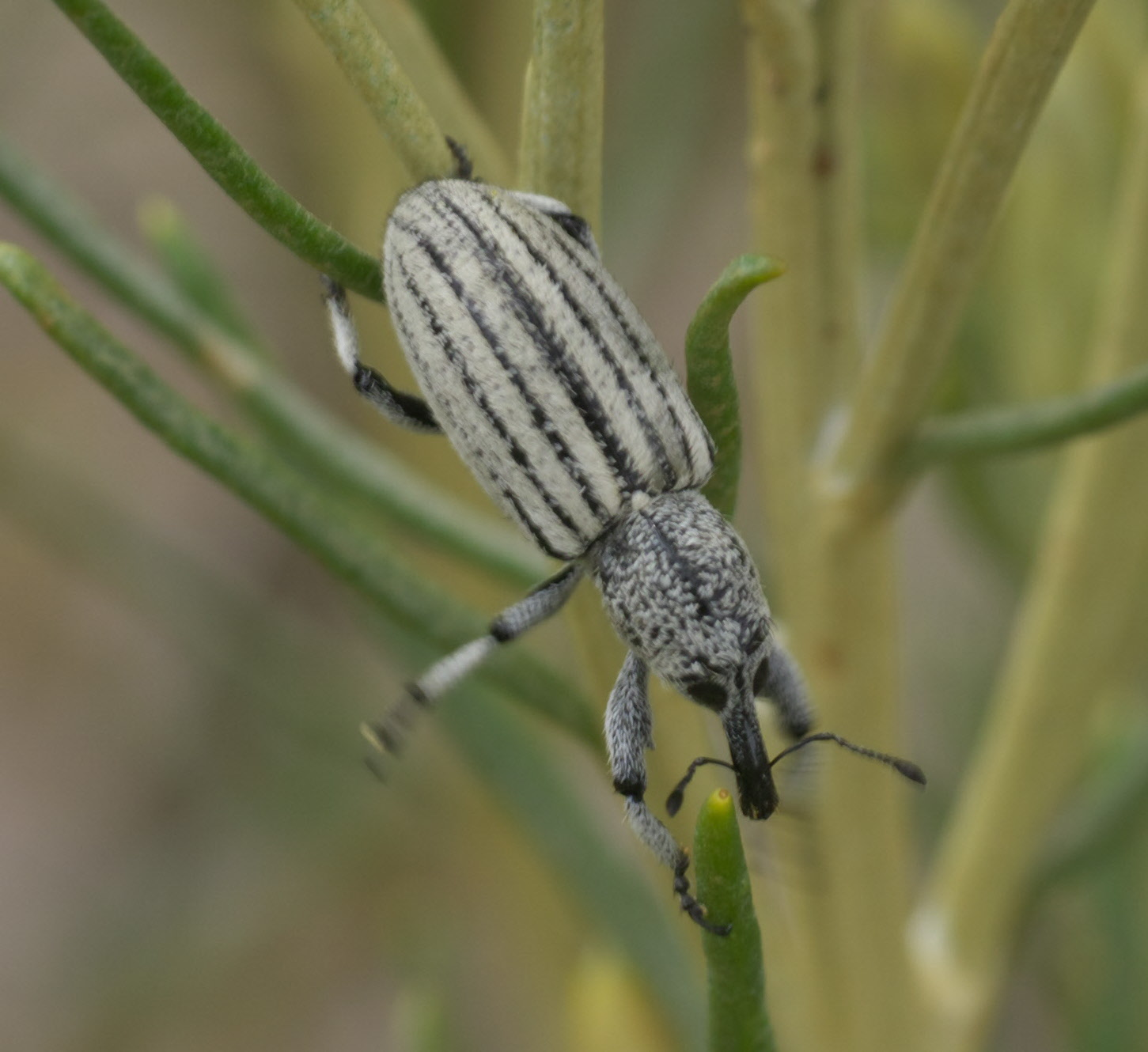
- Myrmex lineatus

Scientific classification
- Kingdom: Animalia
- Phylum: Arthropoda
- Clade: Pancrustacea
- Class: Insecta
- Order: Coleoptera
- Suborder: Polyphaga
- Infraorder: Cucujiformia
- Superfamily: Curculionoidea
- Family: Curculionidae
- Subfamily: Curculioninae
- Tribe: Otidocephalini

= Otidocephalini =

Tribe of beetles

Otidocephalini is a tribe of antlike weevils in the beetle family Curculionidae, occurring in North and South America. There are 6 genera in Otidocephalini.

== Genera ==
Genera belonging to the tribe Otidocephalini:

- Laemomerus Kirsch, 1874
- Micromyrmex Sleeper, 1953^{i c g b}
- Myrmex Sturm, 1826^{i c g b}
- Oopterinus Casey, 1892^{i c g b}
- Otidocephalus Chevrolat, 1832
- Ptinopsis Champion, 1906

Data sources: i = ITIS, c = Catalogue of Life, g = GBIF, b = Bugguide.net
