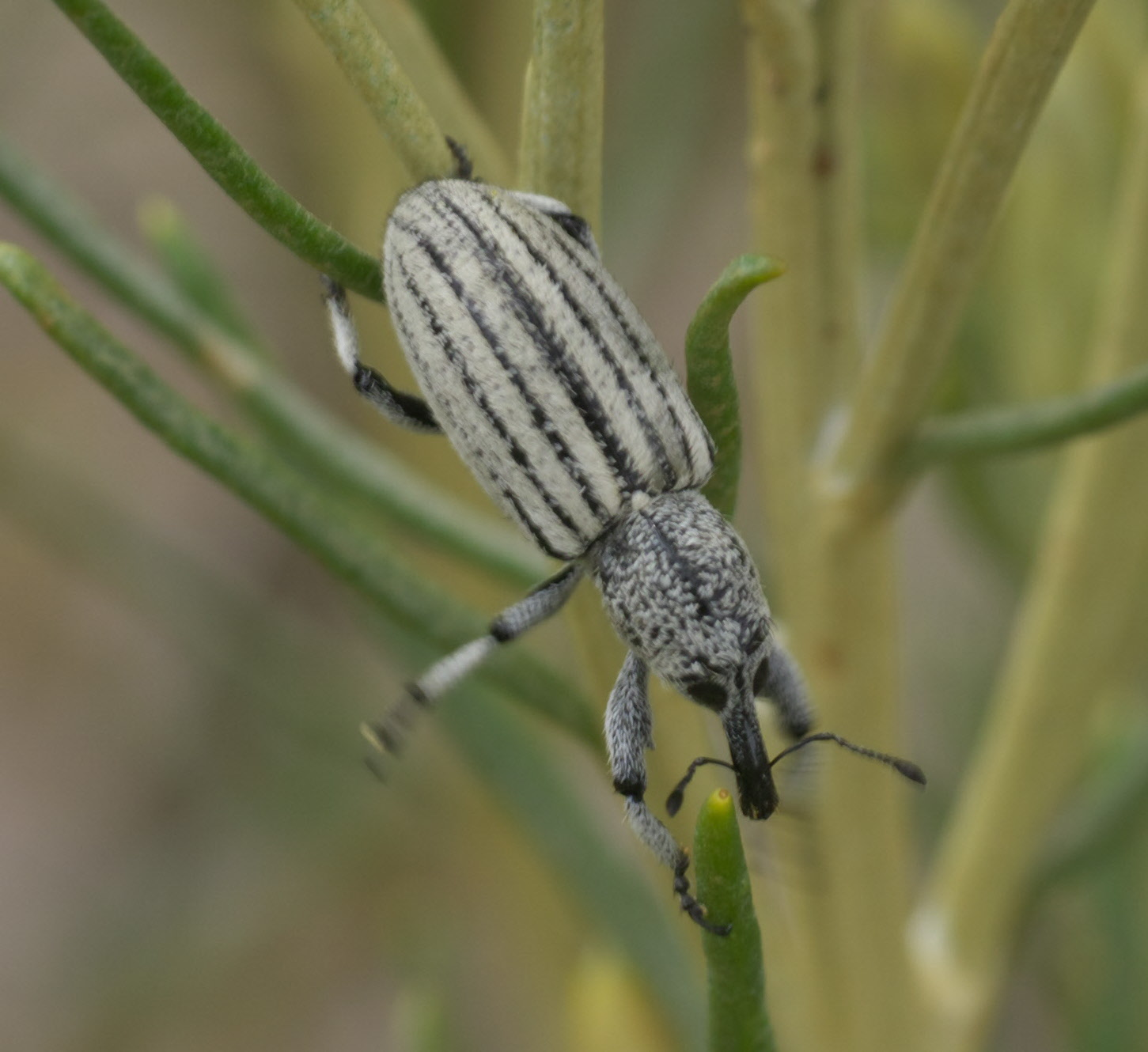
- Myrmex lineatus

Scientific classification
- Domain: Eukaryota
- Kingdom: Animalia
- Phylum: Arthropoda
- Class: Insecta
- Order: Coleoptera
- Suborder: Polyphaga
- Infraorder: Cucujiformia
- Family: Curculionidae
- Genus: Myrmex; Sturm, 1826

= Myrmex (beetle) =

Genus of beetles

Myrmex is a genus of snout and bark beetles in the family Curculionidae. There are at least 30 described species in Myrmex.

== Species ==
- Myrmex algerti Sleeper, 1953
- Myrmex arizonicus (Schaeffer, 1907)
- Myrmex basalis (Schaeffer, 1907)
- Myrmex berboscii Guérin-Méneville, 1844
- Myrmex cabimana Sleeper, 1954
- Myrmex carinicollis (Horn, 1895)
- Myrmex championi Sleeper, 1954
- Myrmex chevrolatii (Horn, 1873)
- Myrmex chiricahuae Sleeper, 1954
- Myrmex chisosensis Sleeper, 1954
- Myrmex dichrous (LeConte, 1876)
- Myrmex egregius (Casey, 1892)
- Myrmex estriatus (Casey, 1892)
- Myrmex floridanus (Casey, 1892)
- Myrmex gillespiensis Sleeper, 1953
- Myrmex herbstii Sturm, 1826
- Myrmex horni Sleeper, 1954
- Myrmex insignis (Casey, 1892)
- Myrmex knowltoni Sleeper, 1953
- Myrmex knulli Sleeper, 1954
- Myrmex laevicollis (Horn, 1873)
- Myrmex lineatus (Pascoe, 1872)
- Myrmex marshalli Sleeper, 1953
- Myrmex myrmex (Herbst, 1797)
- Myrmex rhois (Fall, 1907)
- Myrmex ruficornis (Casey, 1892)
- Myrmex salvadorensis Kuschel, 1956
- Myrmex schaefferi Sleeper, 1954
- Myrmex scrobicollis (Boheman, 1843)
- Myrmex semirufa Sleeper, 1953
- Myrmex semirufus (Green, 1920)
- Myrmex setosis Sleeper, 1970
- Myrmex speculator (Casey, 1892)
- Myrmex subglaber (Schaeffer, 1907)
- Myrmex texanus (Schaeffer, 1907)
- Myrmex ulkei (Horn, 1873)
- Myrmex uniformis (Champion, 1903)
- Myrmex vandykei Sleeper, 1970
- Myrmex ventralis Van Dyke, 1930
