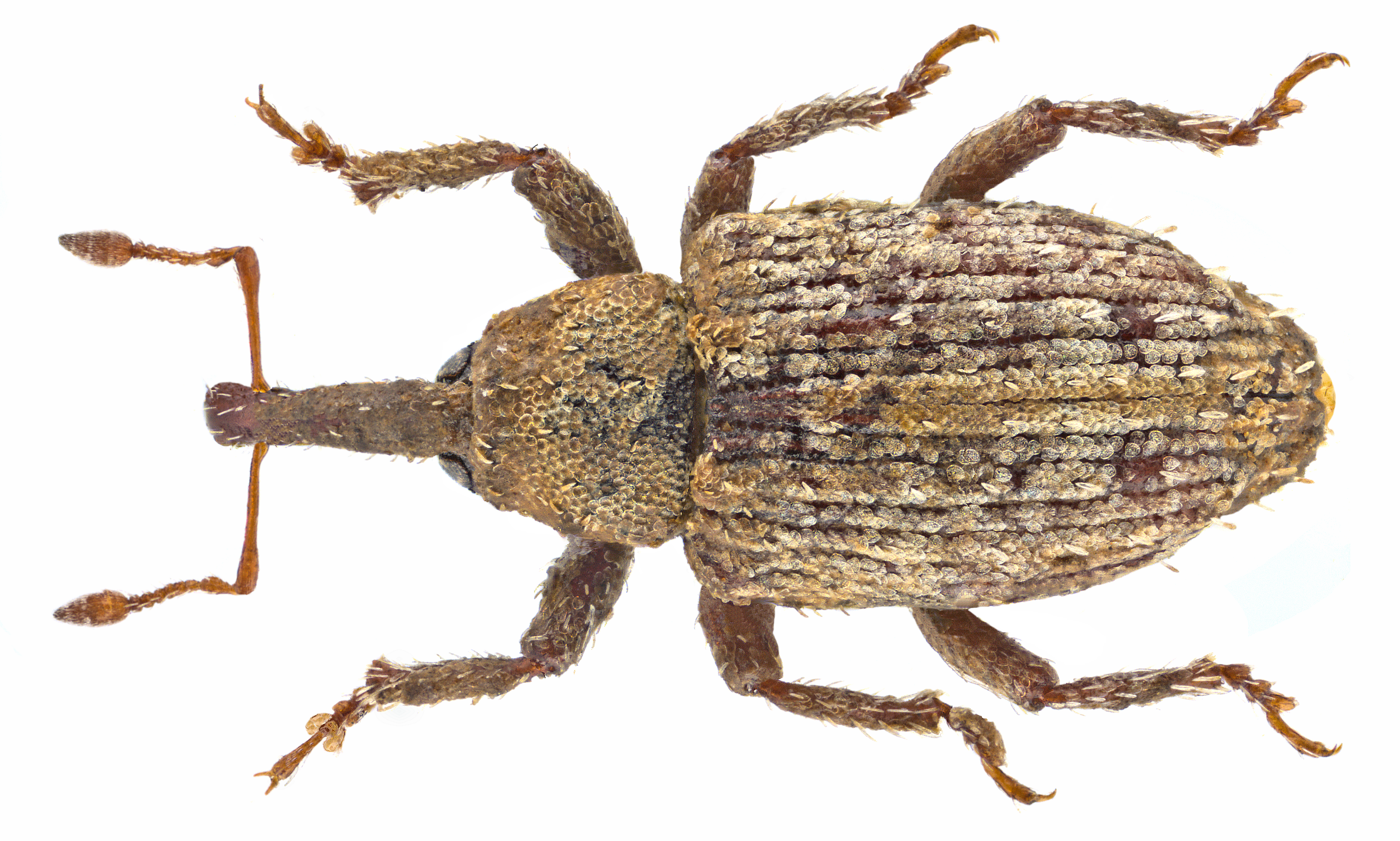
- Pseudostyphlus pillumus

Scientific classification
- Domain: Eukaryota
- Kingdom: Animalia
- Phylum: Arthropoda
- Class: Insecta
- Order: Coleoptera
- Suborder: Polyphaga
- Infraorder: Cucujiformia
- Family: Curculionidae
- Genus: Pseudostyphlus; Tournier, 1874

= Pseudostyphlus =

Genus of beetles

Pseudostyphlus is a genus of beetles belonging to the family Curculionidae.

The species of this genus are found in Europe.

Species:

- Pseudostyphlus bilunulatus Desbrochers, 1892
- Pseudostyphlus dorytomiformis Pic, 1913
