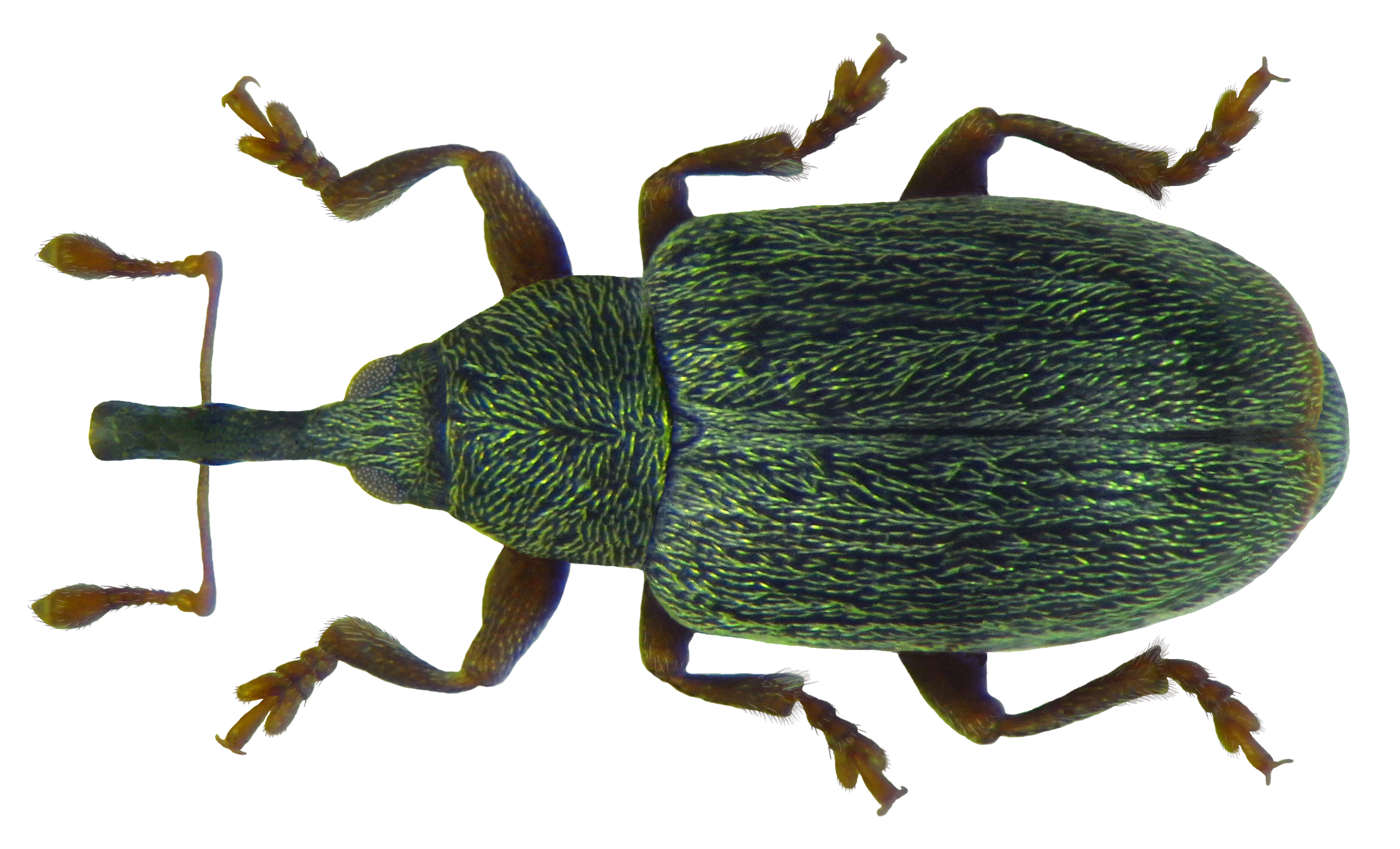
- Acalyptus carpini

Scientific classification
- Kingdom: Animalia
- Phylum: Arthropoda
- Clade: Pancrustacea
- Class: Insecta
- Order: Coleoptera
- Suborder: Polyphaga
- Infraorder: Cucujiformia
- Superfamily: Curculionoidea
- Family: Curculionidae
- Tribe: Acalyptini
- Genus: Acalyptus; Schönherr, 1833

= Acalyptus =

Genus of beetles

Acalyptus is a genus of true weevils in the family of beetles known as Curculionidae. There is at least one described species in Acalyptus, A. carpini.
