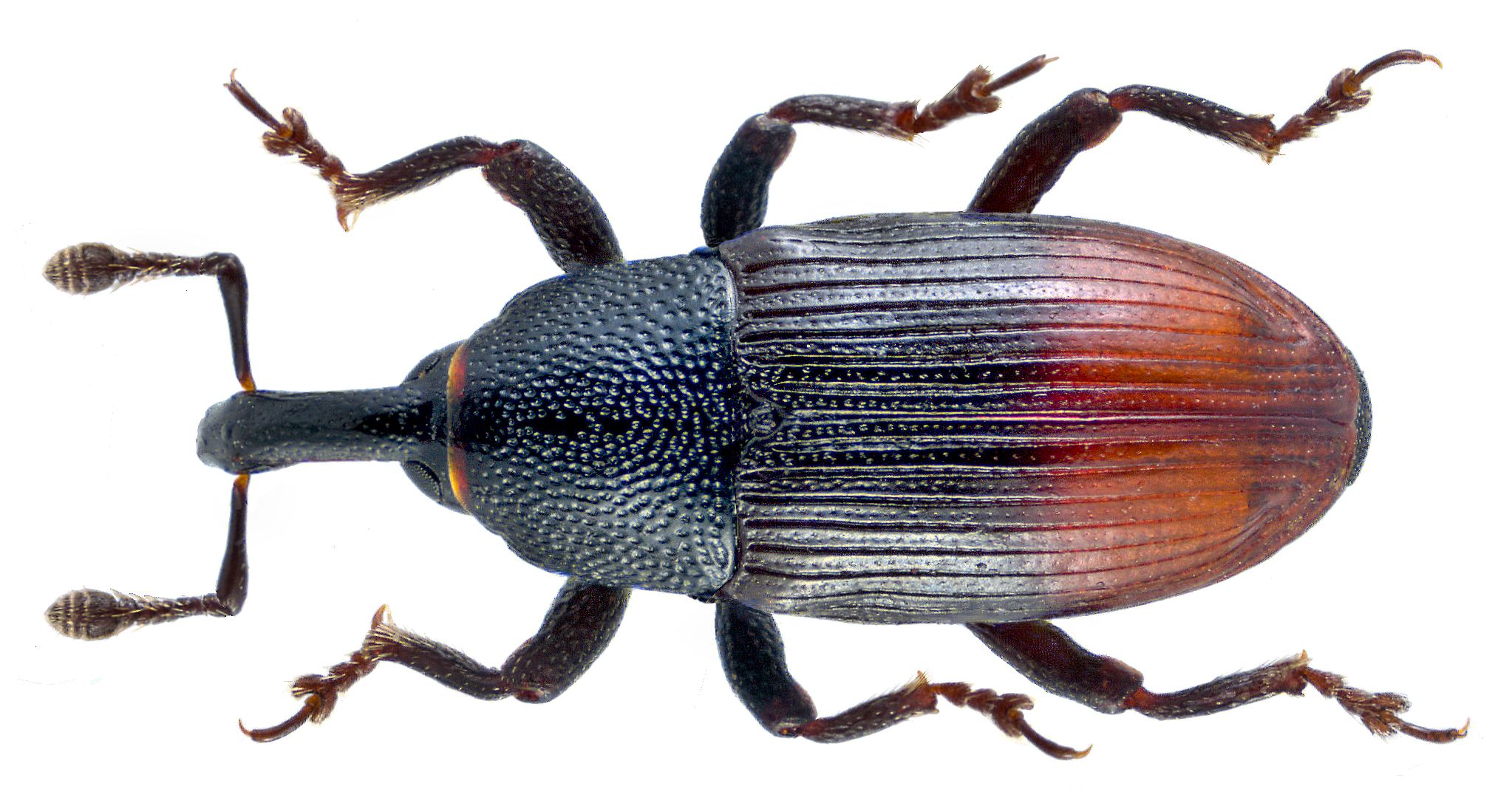

Scientific classification
- Kingdom: Animalia
- Phylum: Arthropoda
- Clade: Pancrustacea
- Class: Insecta
- Order: Coleoptera
- Suborder: Polyphaga
- Infraorder: Cucujiformia
- Superfamily: Curculionoidea
- Family: Curculionidae
- Genus: Baris
- Species: B. analis

Binomial name
- Baris analis (Olivier, 1790)

= Baris analis =

Species of beetle

Baris analis is a species of beetle belonging to the family Curculionidae.

It is native to Europe.
