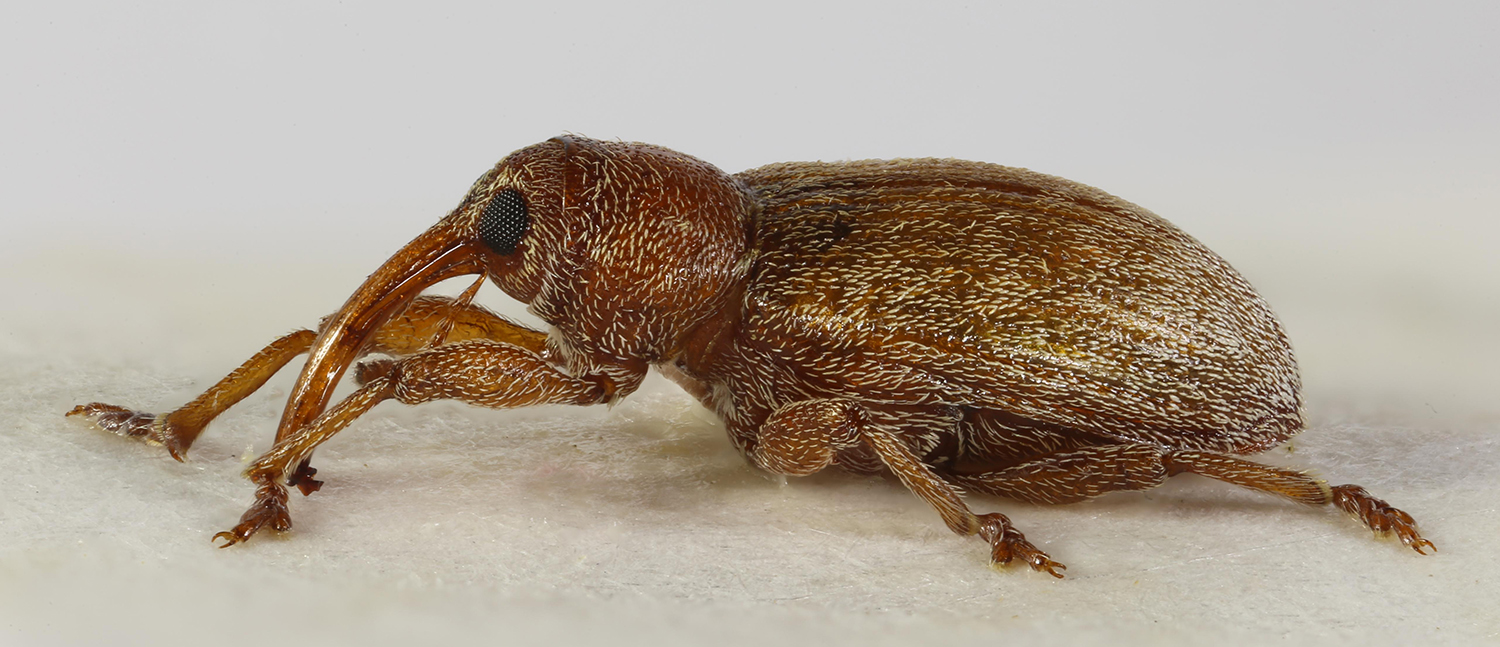
- Dorytomus melanophthalmus, North Wales

Scientific classification
- Kingdom: Animalia
- Phylum: Arthropoda
- Clade: Pancrustacea
- Class: Insecta
- Order: Coleoptera
- Suborder: Polyphaga
- Infraorder: Cucujiformia
- Superfamily: Curculionoidea
- Family: Curculionidae
- Subfamily: Curculioninae; Latreille, 1802

Diversity
- About 30 tribes

= Curculioninae =

Subfamily of beetles

The beetle subfamily Curculioninae is part of the weevil family Curculionidae. It contains over 23,500 described species in 2,200 genera, and is therefore the largest weevil subfamily. Given that the beetle order (Coleoptera) contains about one-quarter of all known organisms, the Curculioninae represent one of the – if not the – most successful radiations of terrestrial Metazoa.

Many weevils of this group are commonly known as flower weevils or acorn and nut weevils, after a food commonly eaten by Curculioninae larvae and imagines — the reproductive organs of plants.

== Systematics ==
This large subfamily is divided into around 30 tribes. Delimitation of the Curculioninae is fairly robust considering its enormous size; there is some dispute, however, in their exact boundary with the Molytinae. The Phrynixini and Trypetidini are also included in the Curculioninae by some authors, but more often they are considered Molytinae; conversely, the Itini are usually placed in the Curculioninae but sometimes in the Molytinae, which are also expanded by certain authors to include, among others, the whole Cryptorhynchinae. These, as well as the Ceutorhynchinae, are sometimes included in the Curculioninae as additional tribes Cryptorhynchini and Ceutorhynchini. And some genera while almost certainly Curculioninae, are too unusual and/or ancient to be easily assigned to a specific tribe.

Features used to distinguish some of the tribes are:

Tribes of Curulioninae (Coleoptera: Curculionidae)
Feature	Associated tribes
Pygidium exposed	Acalyptini; Ceutorhynchini
Foreleg femora with large triangular tooth	Camarotini
Tarsi with one claw (not two)	Cryptoplini (including Haplonychini)
Mandibular (chewing) motion vertical (not horizontal)	some Curculionini
Prothorax with lateral keels	Derelomini
Prothorax narrowed at base (ant mimic)	Erodiscini; Otidocephalini
Hindleg femora enlarged	Eugnomini (with triangular tooth); Rhamphini (swollen for jumping)
Tarsal claws fused at base	Smicronychini
Prosternum anterior to foreleg coxae has a groove into which the rostrum is tucked (if groove continues posterior to coxae: Cryptorhynchinae)	Storeini

=== List of tribes ===
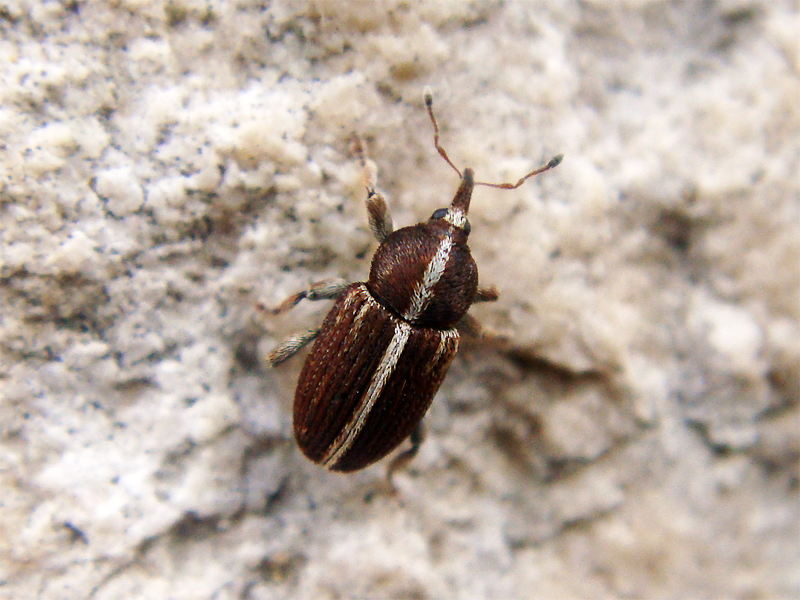
Tychius

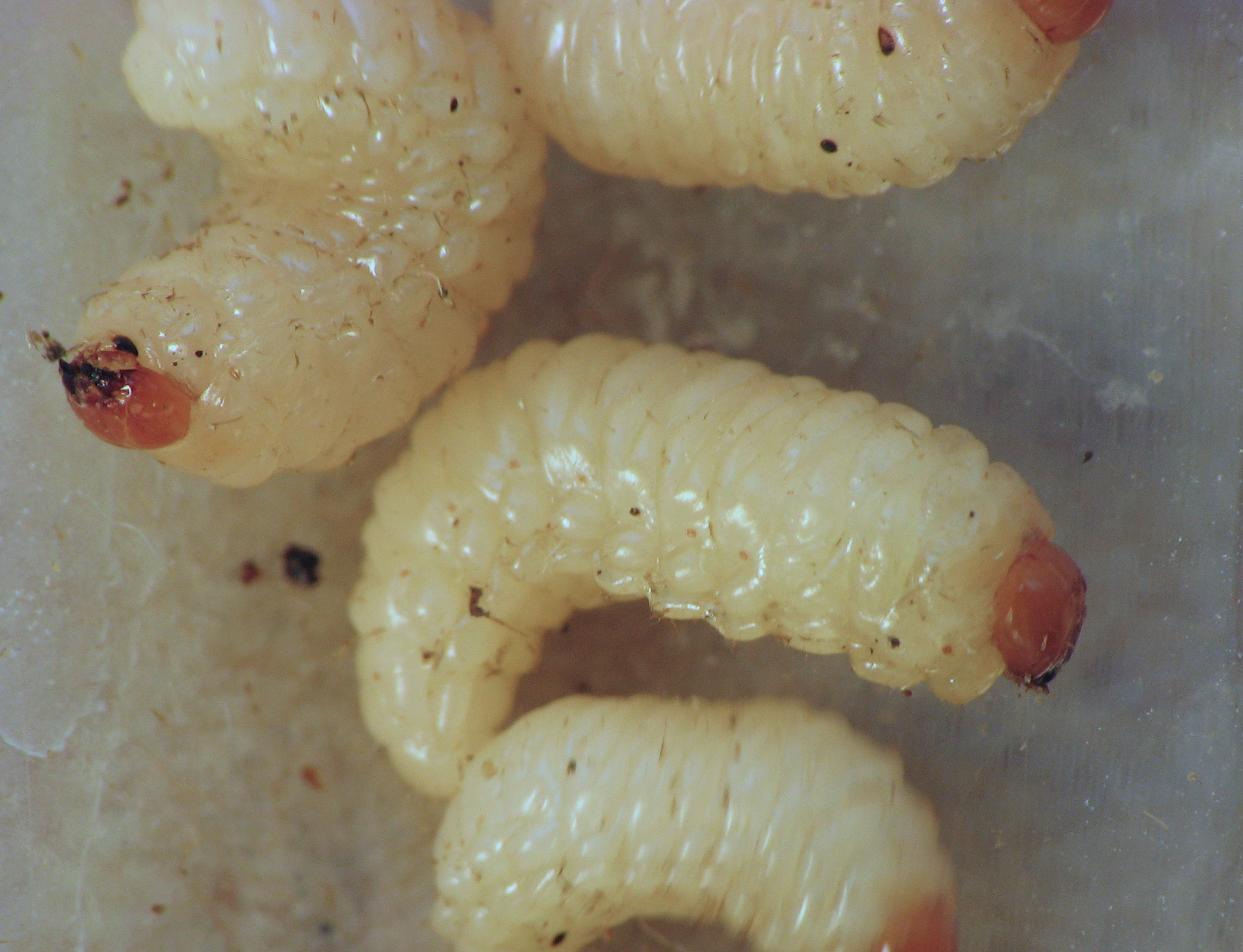
Curculio, larva

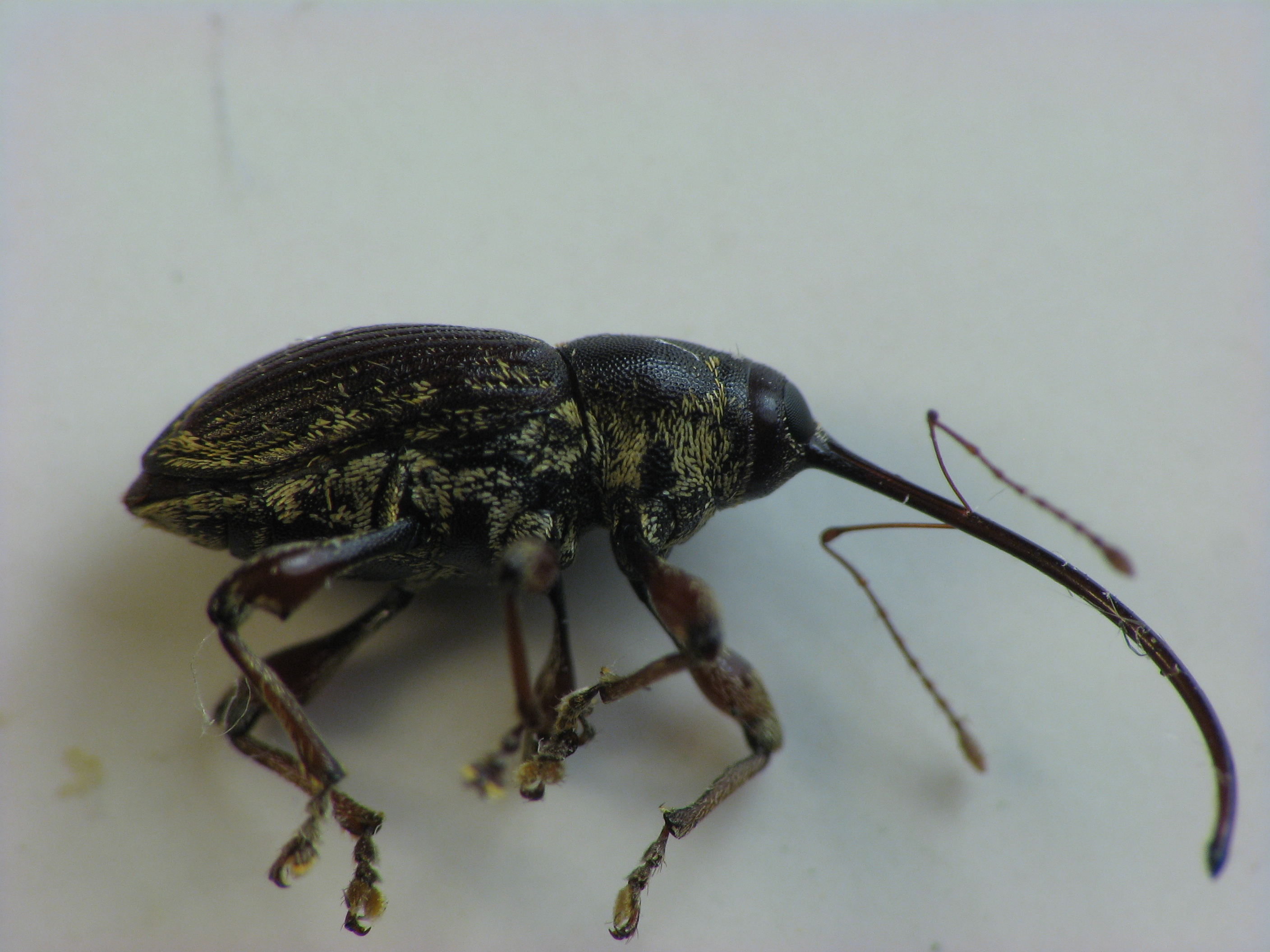
Curculio sayi

The subfamily Curculioninae consists of the following tribes:
Some notable genera are also listed.

- Acalyptini Thomson, 1859
  - Acalyptus
  - Anchylorhynchus
- AcentriniSeidlitz, 1890
- Acentrusini Alonso-Zarazaga, 2005
- Ancylocnemidini Voss, 1962
- Anoplini Bedel, 1884
- Anthonomini Thomson, 1859
  - Anthonomus
  - Brachonyx
- Camarotini Schönherr, 1833
- Ceratopodini Lacordaire, 1863
- Cionini Schönherr, 1825
  - Cionus
- Cranopoeini Kuschel, 2009
- Cryptoplini Lacordaire, 1863
- Curculionini Latreille, 1802
  - Curculio
- Derelomini Lacordaire, 1865
- Diabathrariini Lacordaire, 1863
- Ellescini Thomson, 1859
  - Dorytomus
  - Ellescus
- Erodiscini Lacordaire, 1863
- Eugnomini Lacordaire, 1863
  - Meriphus
  - Pactolotypus
- Geochini Zimmerman, 1994
- Gonipterini Lacordaire, 1863
  - Gonipterus
- Itini Reitter, 1913
- Mecinini Gistel, 1848
  - Mecinus
  - Rhinusa
- Neosharpiini Hoffmann, 1956
- Nerthopini Lacordaire, 1865
- Otidocephalini Lacordaire, 1863
- Piazorhinini Lacordaire, 1863
- Prionobrachiini Hustache, 1938
- Pyropini Lacordaire, 1865
- Rhamphini Rafinesque, 1815
  - Rhynchaenus
- Smicronychini Seidlitz, 1891
- Sphaeriopoeini Kuschel, 2003
- Storeini Lacordaire, 1863
  - Glaucopela
  - Peristoreus
- Styphlini Jekel, 1861
  - Pseudostyphlus
- Tychiini Gistel, 1848
  - Lignyodes
  - Tychius
- Ulomascini Lacordaire, 1865
  - Misophrice
- Viticiini Morimoto, 1983

== See also ==
- List of Curculioninae genera
