= Rutilus (disambiguation) =

Rutilus may refer to:

== Species ==
- Rutilus, various species of fish
- Anthonomus rutilus, species of true weevil
- Ariefusus rutilus, species of sea snail
- Bagarius rutilus, species of sisorid catfish
- Chroogomphus rutilus, species of fungus
- Cryptoblepharus rutilus, species of lizard
- Diplochaetus rutilus, species of ground beetle
- Dolichoderus rutilus, species of ant
- Hymenobacter rutilus, bacteria
- Mesotes rutilus, species of snake
- Nephalioides rutilus, species of beetle
- Toxorhynchites rutilus, species of mosquito
- Oecomys rutilus, species of rodent
- Ordishia rutilus, species of moth
- Phasianotrochus rutilus, species of sea snail
- Phyllotrox rutilus, species of true weevil
- Potamogeton rutilus, species of flowering plant
- Pseudochromis rutilus, species of ray-finned fish
- Sarcodon rutilus, species of tooth fungus
- Toxorhynchites rutilus septentrionalis, insect

== People ==
- Gaius Marcius Rutilus, Roman dictator
- Gaius Nautius Rutilus, Roman consul
- Spurius Nautius Rutilus (consul 488 BC) (fl. c. 493 – 488 BC), Roman aristocrat
- Spurius Nautius Rutilus (consular tribune 419 BC), Roman consular tribune
- Spurius Nautius Rutilus (consular tribune 424 BC), Roman consular tribune
- Proculus Verginius Tricostus Rutilus, Roman consul
- Titus Verginius Tricostus Rutilus (died 463 BC), Roman consul
- Publius Cornelius Rutilus Cossus, Roman statesman
