= Phyllotrox =

Scientific classification
- Kingdom: Animalia
- Phylum: Arthropoda
- Class: Insecta
- Order: Coleoptera
- Suborder: Polyphaga
- Infraorder: Cucujiformia
- Family: Curculionidae
- Tribe: Derelomini
- Genus: Phyllotrox; Schönherr, 1843

Genus of beetles

Phyllotrox is a genus of true weevils in the beetle family Curculionidae. There are at least 60 described species in Phyllotrox.

== Species ==
These 60 species belong to the genus Phyllotrox:

- Phyllotrox abdominalis Schaufuss, 1866
- Phyllotrox aristidis Voisin, 1986
- Phyllotrox ater Champion, 1902
- Phyllotrox atratus Franz, 2006
- Phyllotrox attaleae Rheinheimer, 2012
- Phyllotrox callosipennis Hustache, 1930
- Phyllotrox canyonaceris Warner, 1976
- Phyllotrox crassipes Champion, 1902
- Phyllotrox deknuydti Rheinheimer, 2014
- Phyllotrox depressus Champion, 1902
- Phyllotrox derivatus (Fall, 1913)
- Phyllotrox dimidiatus Faust, 1893
- Phyllotrox elongatulus Voss, 1954
- Phyllotrox eupatorii Voss, 1954
- Phyllotrox ferrugineus LeConte, 1876
- Phyllotrox flavescens Champion, 1902
- Phyllotrox fulvipennis Sleeper, 1955
- Phyllotrox fulvus Champion, 1902
- Phyllotrox inconspicuus Champion, 1902
- Phyllotrox lamottei Voisin, 1989
- Phyllotrox liturellus Suffrian, 1871
- Phyllotrox maculicollis Champion, 1902
- Phyllotrox marcidus Champion, 1902
- Phyllotrox marginellus Faust, 1893
- Phyllotrox mecinoides Champion, 1902
- Phyllotrox megalops Champion, 1902
- Phyllotrox melastomataceae Voss, 1954
- Phyllotrox micros Rheinheimer, 2012
- Phyllotrox montanus Champion, 1902
- Phyllotrox mundus Faust, 1893
- Phyllotrox nigripennis Hustache, 1930
- Phyllotrox nigriventris Hustache, 1929
- Phyllotrox nigroventris Hustache, 1930
- Phyllotrox nitens Rheinheimer, 2014
- Phyllotrox nubifer LeConte, 1876
- Phyllotrox pallidus Fåhraeus, 1843
- Phyllotrox posticus Schaufuss, 1866
- Phyllotrox propoculis Rheinheimer, 2012
- Phyllotrox pseudomicros Rheinheimer, 2012
- Phyllotrox pusillus Kirsch, 1874
- Phyllotrox quadricollis Fall, 1907
- Phyllotrox rostralis Voss, 1954
- Phyllotrox rubiginosus Faust, 1893
- Phyllotrox rufipennis Schaufuss, 1866
- Phyllotrox rufipes Faust, 1893
- Phyllotrox rufus Schoenherr, 1843
- Phyllotrox rugirostris Schaufuss, 1866
- Phyllotrox rutilus (Fall, 1913)
- Phyllotrox schirmi Voss, 1954
- Phyllotrox sejunctus (Fall, 1913)
- Phyllotrox semirufus Boheman, 1843
- Phyllotrox seriatus Clark, 1990
- Phyllotrox sericeus Faust, 1893
- Phyllotrox snizeki Rheinheimer, 2012
- Phyllotrox speculator Kirsch, 1874
- Phyllotrox subopacus Schaufuss, 1866
- Phyllotrox sulcirostris Champion, 1902
- Phyllotrox tatianae Franz, 2006
- Phyllotrox variabilis Schaufuss, 1866
- Phyllotrox variegatus Suffrian, 1871
