= Toxorhynchites christophi =

Scientific classification
- Kingdom: Animalia
- Phylum: Arthropoda
- Clade: Pancrustacea
- Class: Insecta
- Order: Diptera
- Family: Culicidae
- Genus: Toxorhynchites
- Species: T. christophi

Binomial name
- Toxorhynchites christophi (Portschinsky, 1884)

Synonyms
- Megarhina christophi Portschinsky, 1884; Toxorhynchites changbaiensis Su & Wang, 1981

Species of non-blood-feeding mosquito

Toxorhynchites christophi is a species of non-hematophagous (non-blood-feeding) mosquito belonging to the genus Toxorhynchites. Found primarily in East Asia, this species is notable for its predatory larvae, which feed on the larvae of other mosquitoes, positioning it as a potential biological control agent against disease-carrying mosquito populations.

== Distribution ==
Toxorhynchites christophi is known to inhabit East Asia, with documented presence in Korea, particularly in forested areas such as treeholes. While the genus Toxorhynchites typically exhibits a pantropical distribution between 35° north and 35° south latitudes, Tx. christophi extends slightly beyond this range, occurring in Korea up to approximately 43° N.

== Description ==
Toxorhynchites christophi is a large mosquito species, with adults growing up to 18 mm in length and boasting a wingspan of approximately 24 mm. Like other members of its genus, it is diurnal and often adorned with iridescent scales and distinctive scale-tufts on its abdominal tail. The aquatic larvae are predatory, targeting the larvae of other mosquito species rather than filter-feeding, a trait that sets them apart from most mosquito larvae.

In Korea, Tx. christophi is commonly known as "광릉왕모기" (Gwangneung wangmogi). The name 왕모기 (wangmogi) translates to "king mosquito", referring to its large size compared to other mosquito species, while "광릉" (Gwangneung) refers to Gwangneung Forest, where this species is frequently observed.

== Nomenclature ==
Tx. christophi was first described in 1884 by Josef Aloizievitsch Portschinsky as Megarhina christophi. The species Toxorhynchites aurifluus was once considered a subspecies of Tx. christophi, but more recent scholarship treats aurifluus as a separate species. The same scholarship also considers Toxorhynchites changbaiensis, described in 1981 by Su & Wang, to be a synonym of Tx. christophi.

== Behavior and ecology ==
Unlike typical mosquitoes, adult Toxorhynchites christophi do not feed on blood, instead relying on carbohydrate-rich sources such as nectar, honeydew, and plant juices. Mating takes place in mid-air, with males and females coordinating their wing beats, and females deposit eggs by flinging them onto water surfaces while hovering.

The larvae are highly predatory, consuming the larvae of other mosquitoes and aquatic insects. In Korea, studies have shown that higher densities of Tx. christophi larvae correlate with reduced populations of dominant mosquito species in treehole ecosystems, underscoring their ecological importance as a keystone predator. This predatory behavior highlights their potential as a natural control method for disease vectors such as Aedes and Anopheles species.

== Disease transmission ==
As adults of Toxorhynchites christophi do not feed on blood, they pose no risk of transmitting diseases to humans or animals. Their non-biting nature, combined with their larvae's predation on pest mosquitoes, makes them beneficial from a public health perspective.
