= Ordishia albofasciata =

Scientific classification
- Domain: Eukaryota
- Kingdom: Animalia
- Phylum: Arthropoda
- Class: Insecta
- Order: Lepidoptera
- Superfamily: Noctuoidea
- Family: Erebidae
- Subfamily: Arctiinae
- Genus: Ordishia
- Species: O. albofasciata

Binomial name
- Ordishia albofasciata (Rothschild, 1922)

Synonyms
- Automolis albofasciata Rothschild, 1922 and Ordishia Rutilus

Species of moth

Ordishia albofasciata is a moth of the family Erebidae first described by Walter Rothschild in 1922. It is found in Brazil.
