= Diodercarus =

Scientific classification
- Domain: Eukaryota
- Kingdom: Animalia
- Phylum: Arthropoda
- Class: Insecta
- Order: Coleoptera
- Suborder: Adephaga
- Family: Carabidae
- Subfamily: Trechinae
- Tribe: Pogonini
- Genus: Diodercarus; Lutshnik, 1931
- Species: D. arrowi

Binomial name
- Diodercarus arrowi Lutshnik, 1931

Genus of beetles

Diodercarus is a genus of ground beetles in the family Carabidae. This genus has a single species, Diodercarus arrowi. It is found in Iran, Iraq, and Saudi Arabia.
