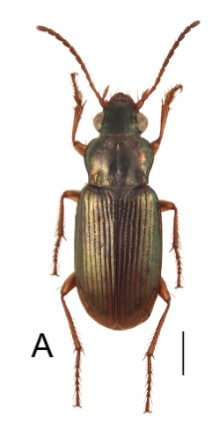

Scientific classification
- Kingdom: Animalia
- Phylum: Arthropoda
- Class: Insecta
- Order: Coleoptera
- Suborder: Adephaga
- Family: Carabidae
- Genus: Pogonus
- Species: P. gilvipes

Binomial name
- Pogonus gilvipes Dejean, 1828

Synonyms
- Pogonus (Pogonus) gilvipes Dejean, 1828; Pogonus apicalis Küster, 1852; Pogonus parallelus Chaudoir, 1872; Pogonus fallax Carret, 1903

= Pogonus gilvipes =

Species of beetle

Pogonus gilvipes is a species of beetle of the family Carabidae. It has a wide Palaearctic distribution and is also present in the Afrotropical Region and on the Canary Islands.

== Description ==
Adults reach a length of about 5.5–6 mm.

== Biology ==
The species can be found in areas colonised by plants of Arthrocnemetea all year except winter. At coastal localities, larvae are thought to develop under the remains of marine algae deposited by the sea on rocky shorelines.
