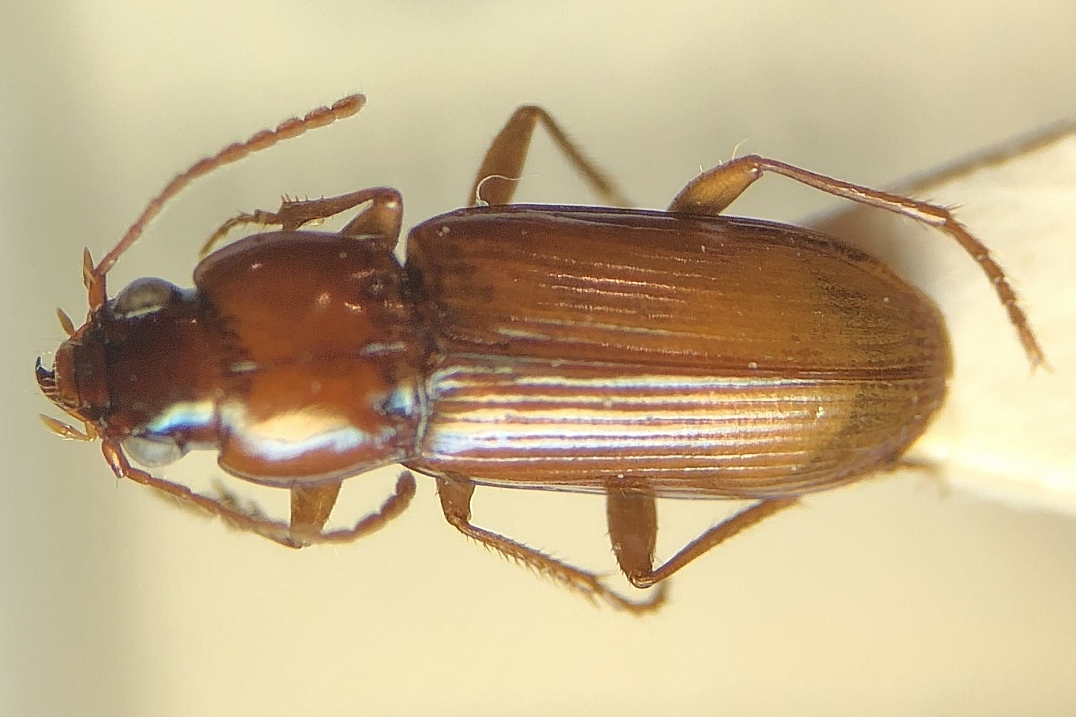

Scientific classification
- Kingdom: Animalia
- Phylum: Arthropoda
- Class: Insecta
- Order: Coleoptera
- Suborder: Adephaga
- Family: Carabidae
- Subfamily: Trechinae
- Tribe: Pogonini
- Genus: Pogonistes; Chaudoir, 1872

= Pogonistes =

Genus of beetles

Pogonistes is a genus of ground beetles in the family Carabidae. There are about eight described species in Pogonistes.

== Species ==
These eight species belong to the genus Pogonistes:

- Pogonistes angustus (Gebler, 1830) (Europe & Northern Asia (excluding China))
- Pogonistes chinensis Habu, 1986 (China)
- Pogonistes convexicollis Chaudoir, 1872 (Palearctic)
- Pogonistes gracilis (Dejean, 1828) Mediterranean)
- Pogonistes grinevi Lutshnik, 1935 (Russia)
- Pogonistes liliputanus (Apfelbeck, 1904) (Greece and Turkey)
- Pogonistes rufoaeneus (Dejean, 1828) (Palearctic)
- Pogonistes testaceus (Dejean, 1828) (Europe and southwest Asia)
