= Ariefusus szobiensis =

Scientific classification
- Kingdom: Animalia
- Phylum: Mollusca
- Class: Gastropoda
- Subclass: Caenogastropoda
- Order: Neogastropoda
- Family: Fasciolariidae
- Genus: Ariefusus
- Species: †A. szobiensis

Binomial name
- †Ariefusus szobiensis (Strausz, 1960)

Synonyms
- † Fusus prevosti var. szobiensis Strausz, 1960 superseded rank and combination)

Species of gastropod

Ariefusus szobiensis is an extinct species of sea snail, a marine gastropod mollusc in the family Fasciolariidae, the spindle snails, the tulip snails and their allies.

== Description ==
The length of the shell attains 4 mm, its diameter 9 mm.

== Distribution ==
Fossils of this marine species were found in Miocene Strata in Hungary.
