= Phyllotrox ferrugineus =

Scientific classification
- Kingdom: Animalia
- Phylum: Arthropoda
- Class: Insecta
- Order: Coleoptera
- Suborder: Polyphaga
- Infraorder: Cucujiformia
- Family: Curculionidae
- Genus: Phyllotrox
- Species: P. ferrugineus

Binomial name
- Phyllotrox ferrugineus LeConte, 1876

Synonyms
- Eucalyptus testaceus Dietz, 1891

Species of beetle

Phyllotrox ferrugineus is a species of true weevil in the beetle family Curculionidae. It is found in North America.
