= Ariefusus =

Scientific classification
- Kingdom: Animalia
- Phylum: Mollusca
- Class: Gastropoda
- Subclass: Caenogastropoda
- Order: Neogastropoda
- Superfamily: Buccinoidea
- Family: Fasciolariidae
- Genus: Ariefusus; Vermeij & Snyder, 2018

Type species
- Fusinus rutilus Nicolay & Berthelot, 1996

Genus of gastropods

Ariefusus is a genus of sea snails, marine gastropod mollusks in the subfamily Fusininae of the family Fasciolariidae, the spindle snails, the tulip snails and their allies.

== Species ==
Species within the genus Ariefusus include:

- Ariefusus rutilus (Nicolay & Berthelot, 1996)
- † Ariefusus szobiensis (Strausz, 1960)

Synonyms

- † Ariefusus prevosti (Hörnes, 1853): synonym of † Snyderifusus prevosti (M. Hörnes, 1853) (superseded combination)
