= Ordishia godmani =

Scientific classification
- Domain: Eukaryota
- Kingdom: Animalia
- Phylum: Arthropoda
- Class: Insecta
- Order: Lepidoptera
- Superfamily: Noctuoidea
- Family: Erebidae
- Subfamily: Arctiinae
- Genus: Ordishia
- Species: O. godmani

Binomial name
- Ordishia godmani (H. Druce, 1884)

Synonyms
- Ischnognatha godmani H. Druce, 1884

Species of moth

Ordishia godmani is a moth of the family Erebidae first described by Herbert Druce in 1884. It is found in Panama.
