= Ochtozetus =

Scientific classification
- Domain: Eukaryota
- Kingdom: Animalia
- Phylum: Arthropoda
- Class: Insecta
- Order: Coleoptera
- Suborder: Adephaga
- Family: Carabidae
- Subfamily: Trechinae
- Tribe: Pogonini
- Genus: Ochtozetus; Chaudoir, 1872

Genus of beetles

Ochtozetus is a genus of ground beetles in the family Carabidae. There are two described species in Ochtozetus, found in South America.

== Species ==
These two species belong to the genus Ochtozetus:

- Ochtozetus bicolor (Brullé, 1838) (Argentina, Brazil, and Uruguay)
- Ochtozetus inexspectatus Bousquet & Laplante, 1997 (Brazil)
