= Hypoleschus =

Scientific classification
- Domain: Eukaryota
- Kingdom: Animalia
- Phylum: Arthropoda
- Class: Insecta
- Order: Coleoptera
- Suborder: Polyphaga
- Infraorder: Cucujiformia
- Family: Curculionidae
- Tribe: Derelomini
- Genus: Hypoleschus; Fall, 1907

Genus of beetles

Hypoleschus is a genus of true weevils in the beetle family Curculionidae. There is one described species in Hypoleschus, H. atratus.
