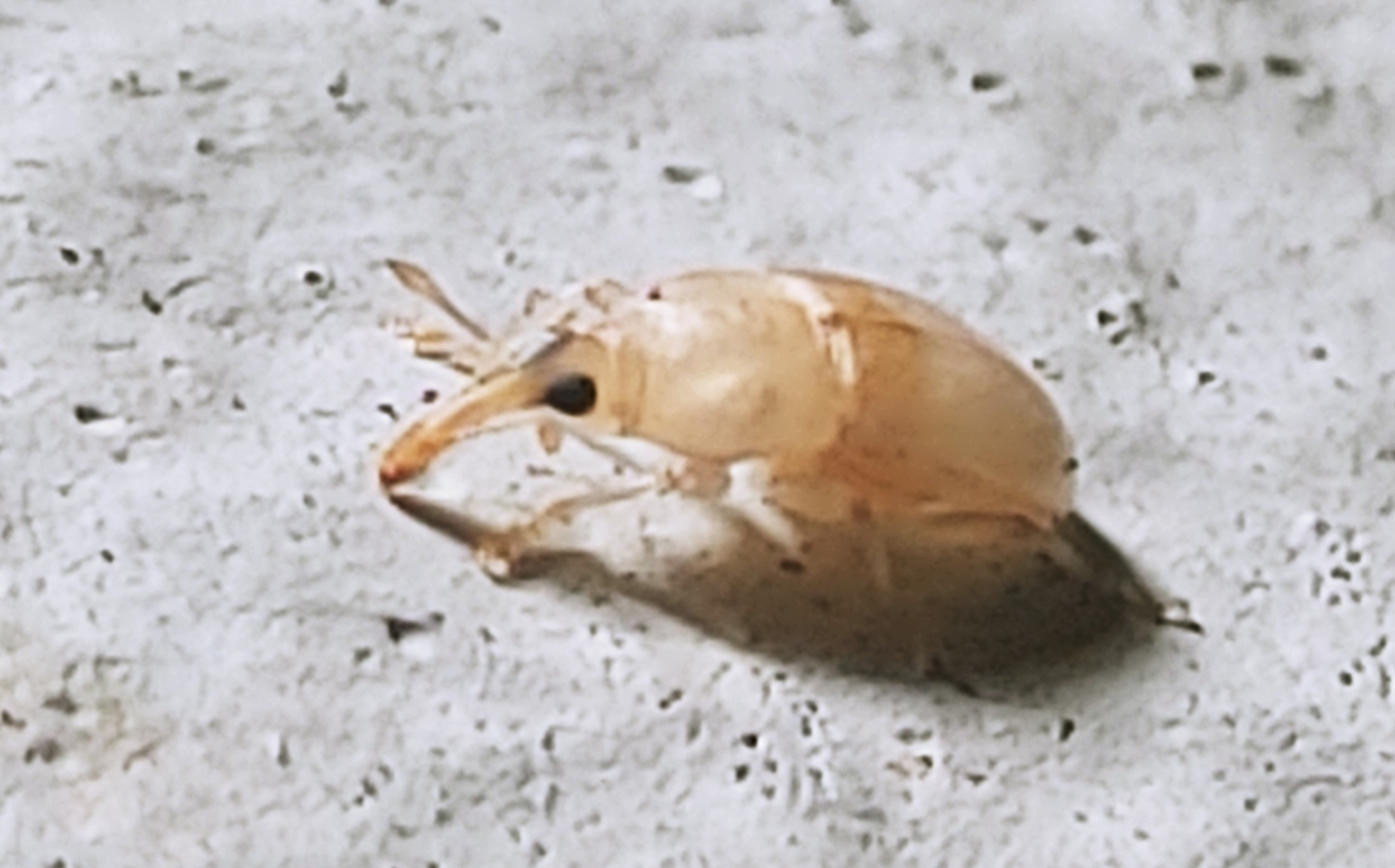

Scientific classification
- Domain: Eukaryota
- Kingdom: Animalia
- Phylum: Arthropoda
- Class: Insecta
- Order: Coleoptera
- Suborder: Polyphaga
- Infraorder: Cucujiformia
- Family: Curculionidae
- Genus: Notolomus
- Species: N. basalis

Binomial name
- Notolomus basalis LeConte, 1876

= Notolomus basalis =

Species of beetle

Notolomus basalis is a species of true weevil in the beetle family Curculionidae. It is found in North America.
