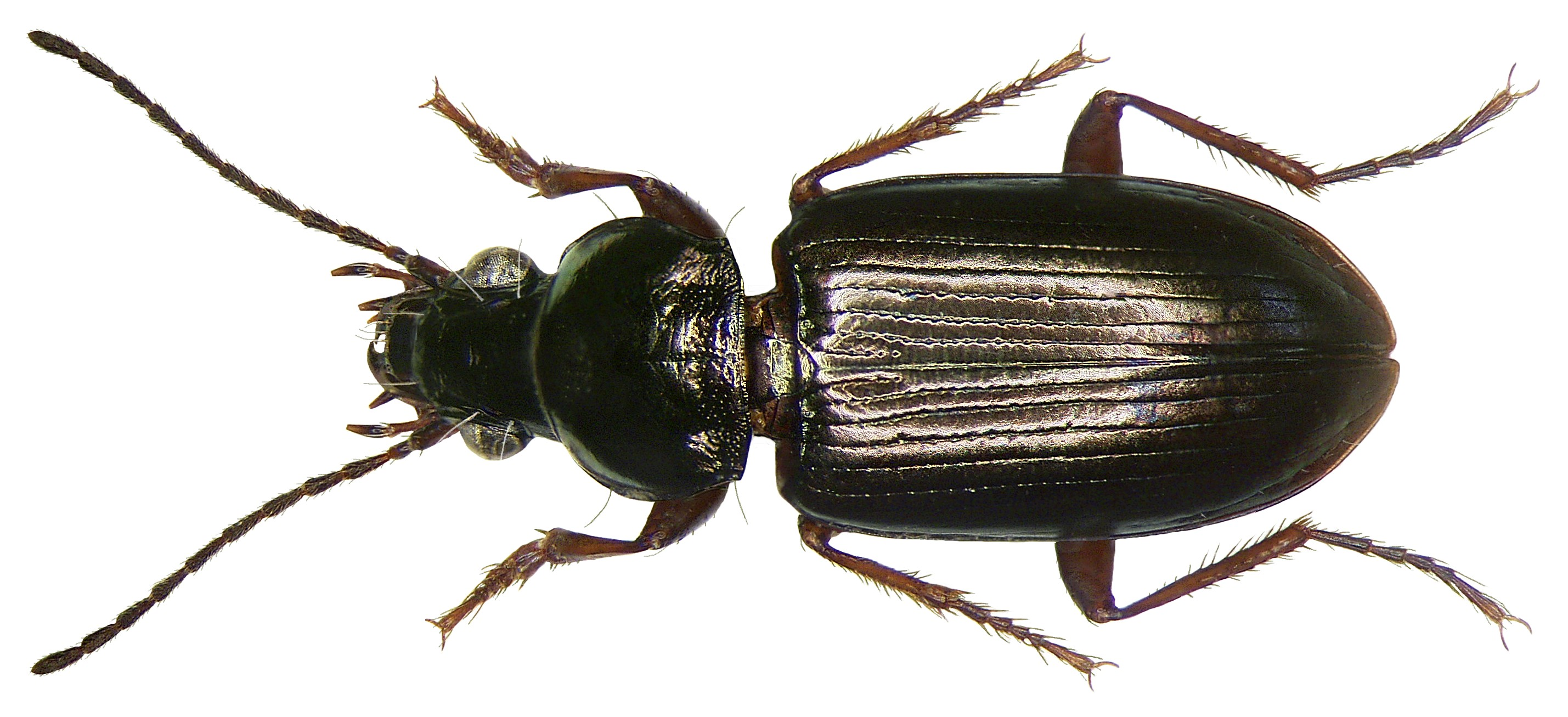
- Pogonus chalceus (Marsham, 1802)

Scientific classification
- Kingdom: Animalia
- Phylum: Arthropoda
- Class: Insecta
- Order: Coleoptera
- Suborder: Adephaga
- Family: Carabidae
- Genus: Pogonus
- Species: P. chalceus

Binomial name
- Pogonus chalceus Marsham, 1802

= Pogonus chalceus =

Species of beetle

Pogonus chalceus is a species of beetle in the family of ground beetles. The scientific name of the species was published in 1802 by Thomas Marsham. The species is halophilic and is commonly found on marine clay along the coast, but it can also be found inland if the salt content is high enough.

It is polymorphic and occurs with both short and long wings, depending on the water regime, making it a suitable species for the study of parallel evolution.

== Subspecies ==
- Pogonus chalceus chalceus (Mediterranean and Atlantic coasts to the North Sea and the Black Sea)
- Pogonus chalceus alticola Antoine, 1955 (North Africa)
- Pogonus chalceus viridanus Dejean, 1828 (Iberian Peninsula)
