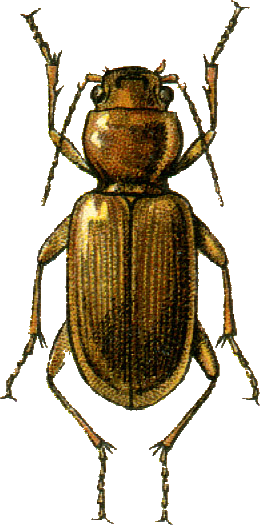

Scientific classification
- Kingdom: Animalia
- Phylum: Arthropoda
- Class: Insecta
- Order: Coleoptera
- Suborder: Adephaga
- Family: Carabidae
- Subfamily: Trechinae
- Tribe: Pogonini
- Genus: Cardiaderus; Dejean, 1828
- Species: C. chloroticus

Binomial name
- Cardiaderus chloroticus (Fischer von Waldheim, 1823)

= Cardiaderus =

Genus of beetles

Cardiaderus is a genus of ground beetles in the family Carabidae. This genus has a single species, Cardiaderus chloroticus. It is found in Bulgaria, Kazakhstan, Romania, Russia, and Ukraine.
