= Ordishia fafner =

Scientific classification
- Domain: Eukaryota
- Kingdom: Animalia
- Phylum: Arthropoda
- Class: Insecta
- Order: Lepidoptera
- Superfamily: Noctuoidea
- Family: Erebidae
- Subfamily: Arctiinae
- Genus: Ordishia
- Species: O. fafner

Binomial name
- Ordishia fafner (Schaus, 1933)

Synonyms
- Automolis hafner Schaus, 1933

Species of moth

Ordishia fafner is a moth of the family Erebidae first described by William Schaus in 1933. It is found in Colombia.
