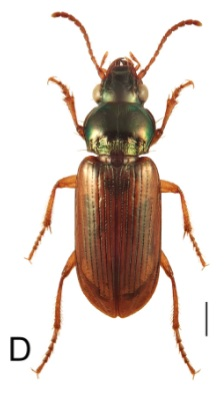

Scientific classification
- Kingdom: Animalia
- Phylum: Arthropoda
- Class: Insecta
- Order: Coleoptera
- Suborder: Adephaga
- Family: Carabidae
- Genus: Pogonus
- Species: P. pallidipennis

Binomial name
- Pogonus pallidipennis Dejean, 1828

Synonyms
- Pogonus (Pogonus) pallidipennis Dejean, 1828; Pogonus rappi Hubenthal, 1915

= Pogonus pallidipennis =

Species of beetle

Pogonus pallidipennis is a species of beetle of the family Carabidae. It is distributed along the Mediterranean coast of the Iberian Peninsula, France and Italy.

== Description ==
Adults reach a length of about 7–8 mm.

== Biology ==
This species has a sub-lapidicolous life, close to wet and saline zones.
