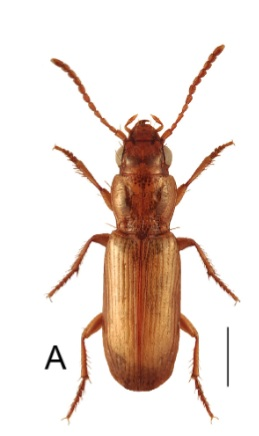

Scientific classification
- Kingdom: Animalia
- Phylum: Arthropoda
- Class: Insecta
- Order: Coleoptera
- Suborder: Adephaga
- Family: Carabidae
- Genus: Sirdenus
- Species: S. grayii

Binomial name
- Sirdenus grayii (Wollaston, 1862)

Synonyms
- Pogonus grayii Wollaston, 1862; Pogonus dilutus Fairmaire, 1873; Pogonus fulvus Baudi di Selve, 1864

= Sirdenus grayii =

Species of beetle

Sirdenus grayii is a species of beetle of the family Carabidae. It is found in the Palaearctic Region (Europe, Asia and North Africa), but also in the Afrotropical Region, the Canary Islands and on Cyprus.

== Description ==
Adults reach a length of about 4–5 mm.

== Biology ==
This species is frequently associated with plants of the Salicornioideae and Arthrocnemetea groups.

The maximum activity period principally occurs in spring, but it has been found from March to July. Adults occupy abandoned galleries excavated by some species of the genus Bledius.
