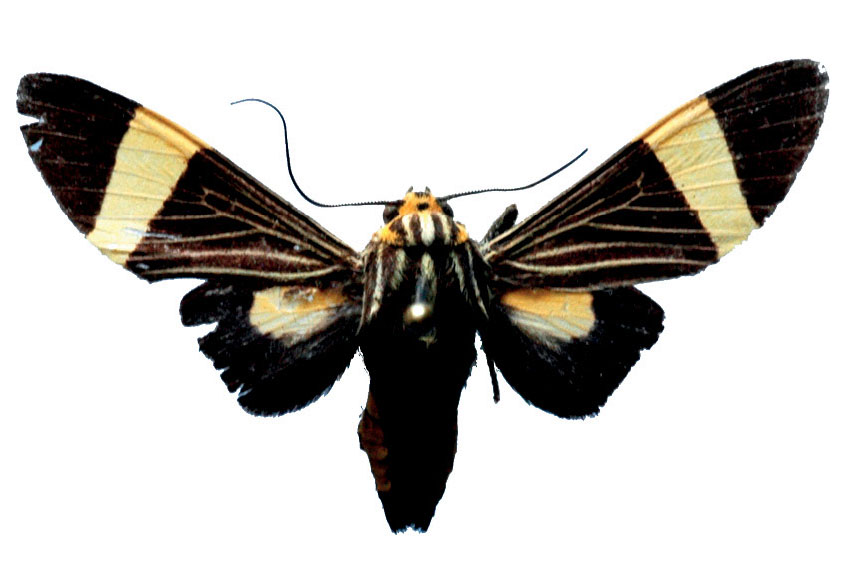

Scientific classification
- Kingdom: Animalia
- Phylum: Arthropoda
- Class: Insecta
- Order: Lepidoptera
- Superfamily: Noctuoidea
- Family: Erebidae
- Subfamily: Arctiinae
- Subtribe: Phaegopterina
- Genus: Ordishia; Watson, 1975

= Ordishia =

Genus of moths

Ordishia is a genus of moths in the family Erebidae.

== Species ==
- Ordishia albofasciata
- Ordishia cingulata
- Ordishia fafner
- Ordishia godmani
- Ordishia klagesi
- Ordishia rutilus
