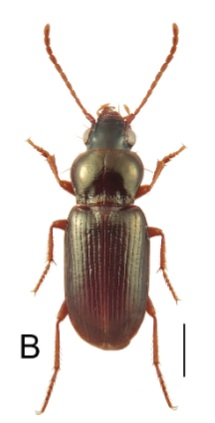

Scientific classification
- Kingdom: Animalia
- Phylum: Arthropoda
- Class: Insecta
- Order: Coleoptera
- Suborder: Adephaga
- Family: Carabidae
- Genus: Pogonistes
- Species: P. gracilis

Binomial name
- Pogonistes gracilis (Dejean, 1828)

Synonyms
- Pogonus gracilis Dejean, 1828

= Pogonistes gracilis =

Species of beetle

Pogonistes gracilis is a species of beetle of the family Carabidae. It is found along the Mediterranean coast of southern Europe, from Spain to Greece (including Malta) and in North Africa.

== Description ==
Adults reach a length of about 4–5 mm.

== Biology ==
The species inhabits coastal and interior regions equally. Adults are active during spring, principally from March to July, but some records are dated from other months such as November. Pogonistes gracilis can be found in direct contact with water when it takes refuge under the rocks on the shores, in damp and saline environments where it occurs.
