= Notolomus bicolor =

Scientific classification
- Kingdom: Animalia
- Phylum: Arthropoda
- Class: Insecta
- Order: Coleoptera
- Suborder: Polyphaga
- Infraorder: Cucujiformia
- Family: Curculionidae
- Genus: Notolomus
- Species: N. bicolor

Binomial name
- Notolomus bicolor LeConte, 1876

Synonyms
- Notolomus myricae LeConte, 1876

Species of beetle

Notolomus bicolor is a species of true weevil in the beetle family Curculionidae. It is found in North America.
