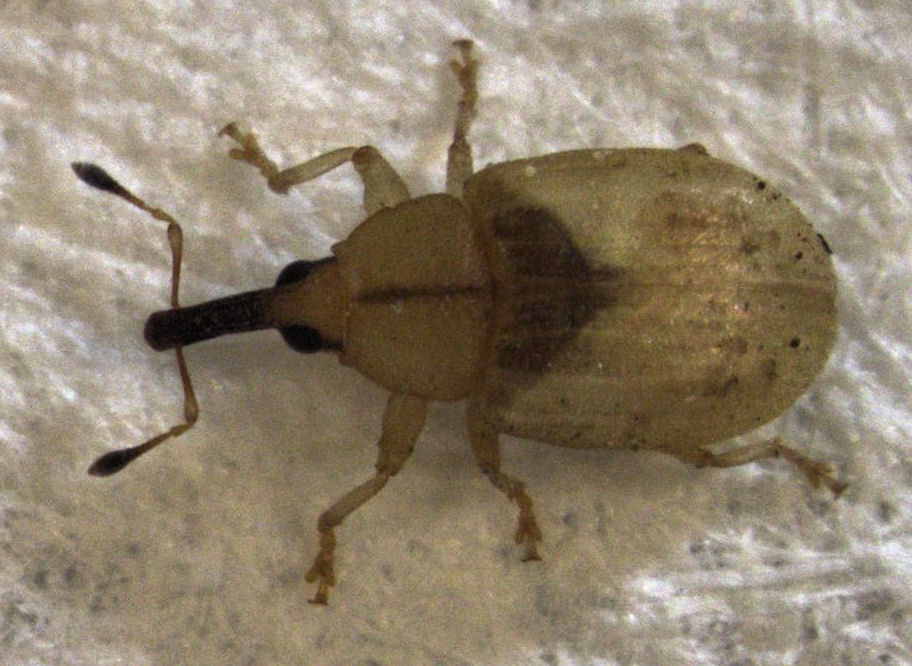
- Derelomus

Scientific classification
- Kingdom: Animalia
- Phylum: Arthropoda
- Class: Insecta
- Order: Coleoptera
- Suborder: Polyphaga
- Infraorder: Cucujiformia
- Family: Curculionidae
- Subfamily: Curculioninae
- Tribe: Derelomini

= Derelomini =

Tribe of beetles

Derelomini is a tribe of true weevils in the family of beetles known as Curculionidae. There are about five genera and eight described species in Derelomini.

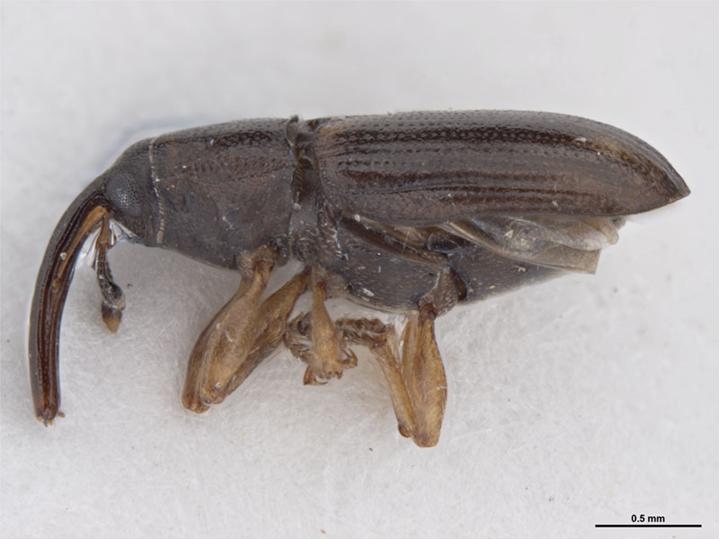
Elaeidobius

== Genera ==
These five genera belong to the tribe Derelomini:

- Derelomus Schönherr, 1825^{i c g b}
- Elaeidobius Kuschel, 1952^{b}
- Hypoleschus Fall, 1907^{i g b}
- Notolomus LeConte, 1876^{i g b}
- Phyllotrox Schönherr, 1843^{i c g b}

Data sources: i = ITIS, c = Catalogue of Life, g = GBIF, b = Bugguide.net
