= Toxorhynchites minimus =

Scientific classification
- Kingdom: Animalia
- Phylum: Arthropoda
- Class: Insecta
- Order: Diptera
- Family: Culicidae
- Genus: Toxorhynchites
- Species: T. minimus

Binomial name
- Toxorhynchites minimus (Theobald, 1905)

Species of fly

Toxorhynchites minimus is a species of zoophilic mosquito belonging to the genus Toxorhynchites. It is found in India, Sri Lanka Indonesia, Malaysia, Philippines and Sumatra. When under mass rearing conditions, the larvae show cannibalism.
