= Mesotes =

Scientific classification
- Kingdom: Animalia
- Phylum: Chordata
- Class: Reptilia
- Order: Squamata
- Suborder: Serpentes
- Family: Colubridae
- Subfamily: Dipsadinae
- Genus: Mesotes; Jan, 1862

Genus of snakes

Mesotes is a genus of snakes of the family Colubridae.

== Geographic range ==
All species in the genus Mesotes are endemic to South America.

== Species ==
The following 2 species are recognized as being valid.

- Mesotes rutilus Prado, 1942 - Prado's coastal house snake
- Mesotes strigatus (Günther, 1858) -coastal house snake

Nota bene: A binomial authority in parentheses indicates that the species was originally described in a genus other than Mesotes.
