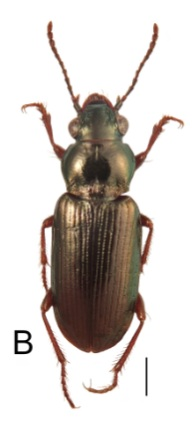

Scientific classification
- Kingdom: Animalia
- Phylum: Arthropoda
- Class: Insecta
- Order: Coleoptera
- Suborder: Adephaga
- Family: Carabidae
- Genus: Pogonus
- Species: P. littoralis

Binomial name
- Pogonus littoralis (Duftschmid, 1812)

Synonyms
- Pogonus (Pogonus) littoralis (Duftschmid, 1812); Carabus littoralis Duftschmid, 1812; Pogonus pilipes Germar, 1817; Pogonus aeruginosus Stephens, 1828; Pogonus provincialis Carret, 1903

= Pogonus littoralis =

Species of beetle

Pogonus littoralis is a species of beetle of the family Carabidae. It is widely distributed in the Palaearctic Region.

== Description ==
Adults reach a length of about 5.5–6.5 mm.

== Biology ==
In some populations along the Adriatic coast, the different life phases of P. littoralis can overlap in the same year.
