= Diplochaetus =

Scientific classification
- Kingdom: Animalia
- Phylum: Arthropoda
- Class: Insecta
- Order: Coleoptera
- Suborder: Adephaga
- Family: Carabidae
- Subfamily: Trechinae
- Tribe: Pogonini
- Genus: Diplochaetus; Chaudoir, 1872

Genus of beetles

Diplochaetus is a genus of ground beetles in the family Carabidae. There are at least four described species in Diplochaetus.

== Species ==
These four species belong to the genus Diplochaetus:

- Diplochaetus emaciatus (Bates, 1891) (Central America and North America)
- Diplochaetus megacephalus Bousquet & Laplante, 1997 (North America)
- Diplochaetus planatus (G.Horn, 1876) (North America)
- Diplochaetus rutilus (Chevrolat, 1863) (North, Central, and South America)
