= Syrdenoidius =

Scientific classification
- Domain: Eukaryota
- Kingdom: Animalia
- Phylum: Arthropoda
- Class: Insecta
- Order: Coleoptera
- Suborder: Adephaga
- Family: Carabidae
- Subfamily: Trechinae
- Tribe: Pogonini
- Genus: Syrdenoidius; Baehr & Hudson, 2001
- Species: S. spinipes

Binomial name
- Syrdenoidius spinipes Baehr & Hudson, 2001

Genus of beetles

Syrdenoidius is a genus of ground beetles in the family Carabidae. This genus has a single species, Syrdenoidius spinipes. It is found in Australia.
