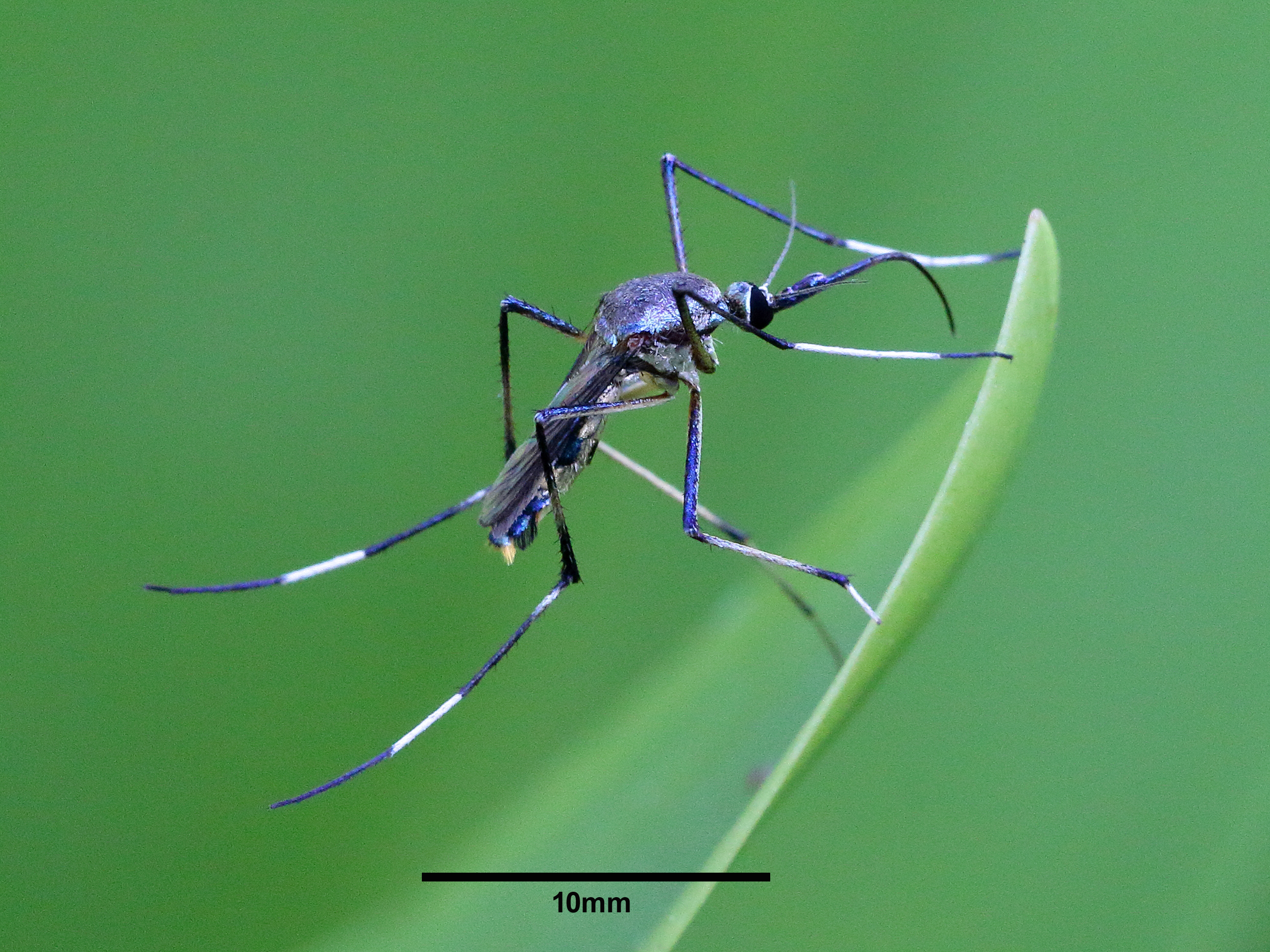
- Adult
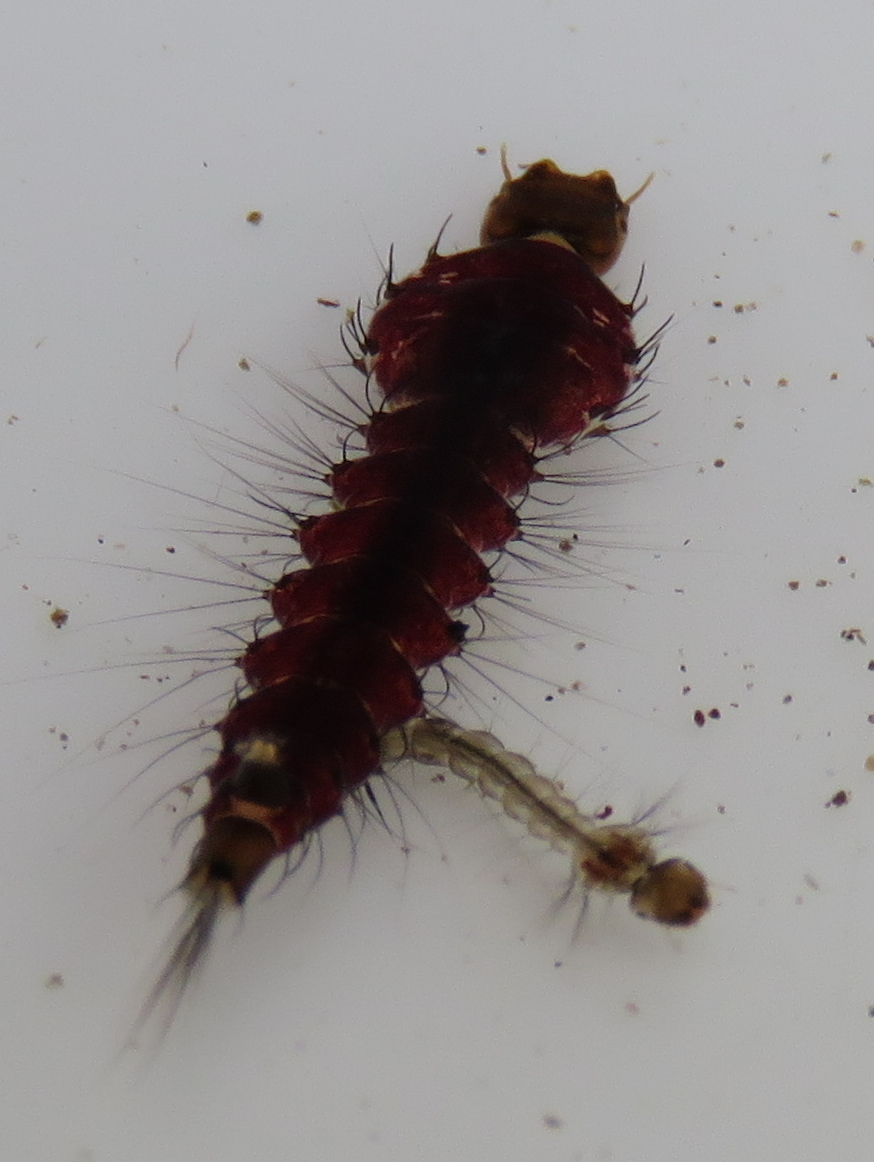
- Larva

Scientific classification
- Kingdom: Animalia
- Phylum: Arthropoda
- Clade: Pancrustacea
- Class: Insecta
- Order: Diptera
- Family: Culicidae
- Genus: Toxorhynchites
- Species: T. speciosus

Binomial name
- Toxorhynchites speciosus (Skuse, 1889)

= Australian elephant mosquito =

Species of mosquito

The Australian elephant mosquito (Toxorhynchites speciosus) is a species of mosquito in the genus Toxorhynchites, also known as elephant mosquitoes. It is the largest mosquito in the world.

== Description ==
T. speciosus are mosquitos with a long, black, downwards proboscis which are half the length of the mosquito. Their proboscis are also distinctively backwards. Their body's are metallic purple and blue with silver markings and tufts of scales along the side of the abdomen. Their hind legs have a pale band near the base of the first tarsal segment and a pale dark tip on the second tarsal segment.

== Distribution ==
This species is Found along the coast and hinterland of New South Wales, Queensland and the Northern Territory.

== Behavior ==
Adult T. speciosus are not blood feeders and are not attracted to humans. They feed of nectar and plant juices.
