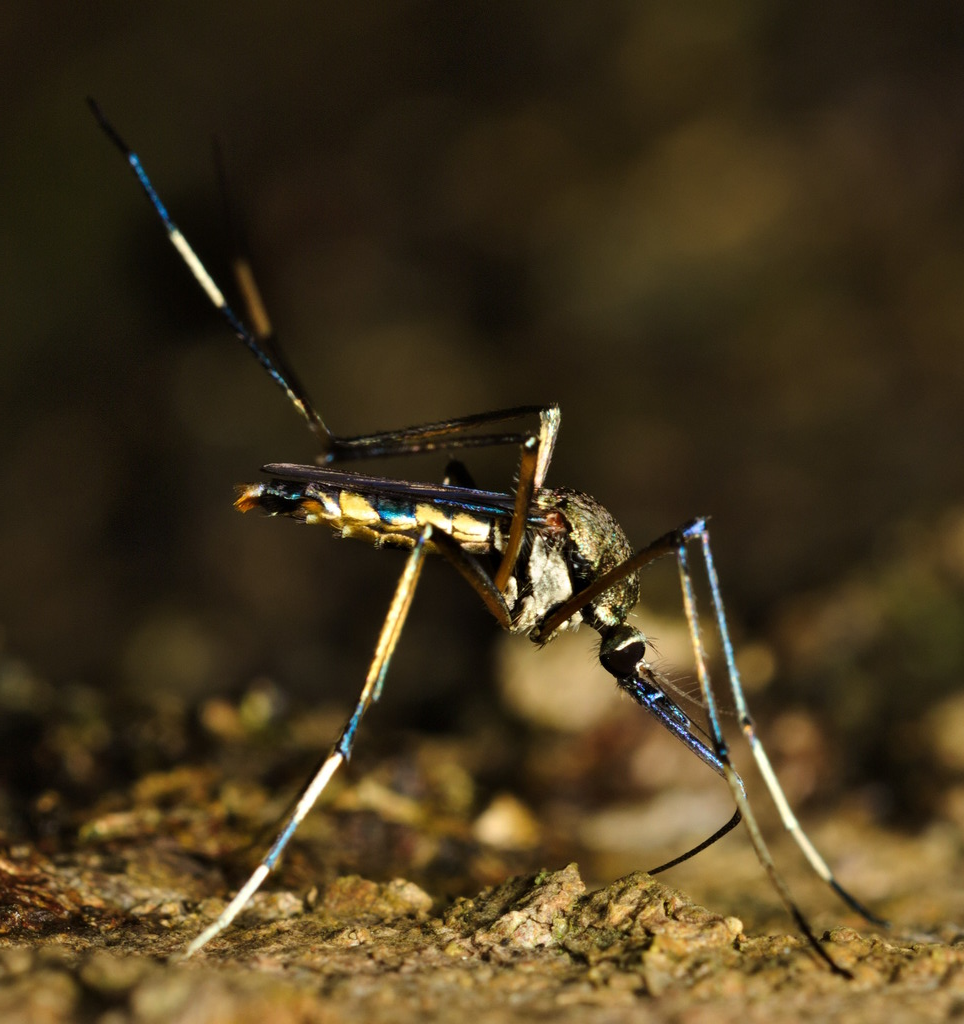

Scientific classification
- Kingdom: Animalia
- Phylum: Arthropoda
- Class: Insecta
- Order: Diptera
- Family: Culicidae
- Genus: Toxorhynchites
- Species: T. splendens

Binomial name
- Toxorhynchites splendens (Wiedemann, 1819)

Synonyms
- Culex regius Tennent, 1859; Megarhina sikkimensis Giles, 1901; Megarhinus gilesii Theobald, 1901

= Toxorhynchites splendens =

Species of fly

Toxorhynchites (Toxorhynchites) splendens is a species of non-hematophagous (not blood-feeding) mosquito belonging to the genus Toxorhynchites. It is widely used as a predator to control dengue mosquitoes.

== Distribution ==
It shows nearly a cosmopolitan distribution throughout the Old World, except African continent both through human influences and natural methods. It is found in India, Sri Lanka Malaysia, Thailand, New Guinea, Fiji Islands, Philippines, Rotuma Island.

== Importance ==
The large expansion may be due to naval transport of larva from one place to another. In 1934, these mosquitoes were introduced to Fiji as a method of biological control of Aedes polynesiensis, and in India and Malaysia to control Aedes aegypti and Aedes albopictus who are prominent vectors of many human diseases. They prefer to consume eggs and larva Aedes aegypti and Anopheles stephensi.

Alphamethrin, deltamethrin, Malathion can be used to control the mosquito.
