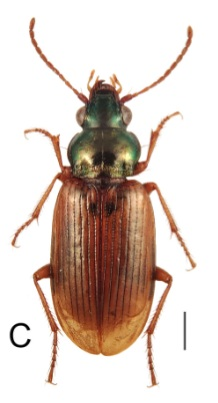

Scientific classification
- Kingdom: Animalia
- Phylum: Arthropoda
- Class: Insecta
- Order: Coleoptera
- Suborder: Adephaga
- Family: Carabidae
- Genus: Pogonus
- Species: P. luridipennis

Binomial name
- Pogonus luridipennis (Germar, 1823)

Synonyms
- Pogonus (Pogonus) luridipennis (Germar, 1822); Harpalus luridipennis Germar, 1822; Pogonus burrellii Curtis, 1824; Pogonus flavipennis Dejean, 1828

= Pogonus luridipennis =

Species of beetle

Pogonus luridipennis, the yellow pogonus, is a small ground beetle. It has a wide distribution in the Palaearctic region, from the Iberian Peninsula to Siberia, where it is found in coastal and interior localities in the Mediterranean and along the Atlantic, as well as along the coast of the North Sea, Black Sea and Caspian Sea.

== Description ==
Adults reach a length of about 6–7 mm.

== Biology ==
The species is associated with saline environments (including sandy salt marshes.) where plants of the genus Salicornia grow.
