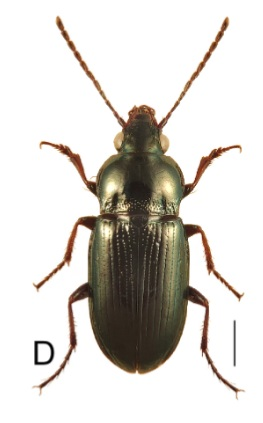

Scientific classification
- Kingdom: Animalia
- Phylum: Arthropoda
- Class: Insecta
- Order: Coleoptera
- Suborder: Adephaga
- Family: Carabidae
- Genus: Pogonus
- Species: P. meridionalis

Binomial name
- Pogonus meridionalis Dejean, 1828

Synonyms
- Pogonus (Pogonoidius) meridionalis Dejean, 1828; Pogonus salinus Motschulsky, 1844; Amara interstitialis Fairmaire, 1856; Pogonus atrocyaneus Dieck, 1870; Pogonus barthei Puel, 1923

= Pogonus meridionalis =

Species of beetle

Pogonus meridionalis is a species of beetle of the family Carabidae. It is found in the Palaearctic region, with a wide distribution from the Iberian Peninsula to Siberia.

== Description ==
Adults reach a length of about 5.5–7 mm (0.22–0.28 in).

== Biology ==
The species can be found in saline areas colonised by plants of the Arthrocnemetea group, the genus Salicornia and the genus Vigna, but also in non-saline environments, as it is less halobiont than other species of the genus. The phenology of a population of P. meridionalis in Elton lake (Volgograd, Russia) was studied in 2008. It had a peak of adult activity in spring (April–May), and the adults which emerged in one year coexisted with adults from the previous year.
