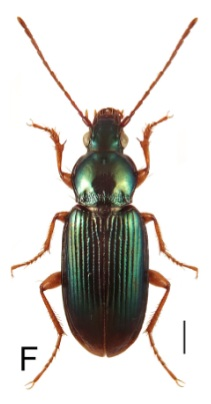

Scientific classification
- Kingdom: Animalia
- Phylum: Arthropoda
- Class: Insecta
- Order: Coleoptera
- Suborder: Adephaga
- Family: Carabidae
- Genus: Pogonus
- Species: P. smaragdinus

Binomial name
- Pogonus smaragdinus Waltl, 1835

Synonyms
- Pogonus (Pogonus) smaragdinus Waltl, 1835; Pogonus viridimicans Fairmaire, 1852

= Pogonus smaragdinus =

Species of beetle

Pogonus smaragdinus is a species of beetle of the family Carabidae. It is present only at coastal and saline interior localities of the meridional extreme of the Iberian Peninsula and in North Africa.

== Description ==
Adults reach a length of about 6.5–8 mm.
