= Phyllotrox nubifer =

Scientific classification
- Kingdom: Animalia
- Phylum: Arthropoda
- Class: Insecta
- Order: Coleoptera
- Suborder: Polyphaga
- Infraorder: Cucujiformia
- Family: Curculionidae
- Genus: Phyllotrox
- Species: P. nubifer

Binomial name
- Phyllotrox nubifer LeConte, 1876

Synonyms
- Phyllotrox fulvipennis Sleeper, 1955

Species of beetle

Phyllotrox nubifer is a species of true weevil in the beetle family Curculionidae. It is found in North America.
