= Nephalioides =

Scientific classification
- Kingdom: Animalia
- Phylum: Arthropoda
- Class: Insecta
- Order: Coleoptera
- Suborder: Polyphaga
- Infraorder: Cucujiformia
- Family: Cerambycidae
- Tribe: Elaphidiini
- Genus: Nephalioides

Genus of beetles

Nephalioides is a genus of beetles in the family Cerambycidae, containing the following species:

- Nephalioides nigriventris (Bates, 1874)
- Nephalioides rutilus (Bates, 1872)
