= Bedeliolus =

Scientific classification
- Domain: Eukaryota
- Kingdom: Animalia
- Phylum: Arthropoda
- Class: Insecta
- Order: Coleoptera
- Suborder: Adephaga
- Family: Carabidae
- Subfamily: Trechinae
- Tribe: Pogonini
- Genus: Bedeliolus; Semenov, 1900

Genus of beetles

Bedeliolus is a genus of ground beetles in the family Carabidae. There are at least three described species in Bedeliolus.

== Species ==
These three species belong to the genus Bedeliolus:

- Bedeliolus freyellus Jedlicka, 1959 (Arab Emirates and Iran)
- Bedeliolus konevi Kryzhanovskij, 1990 (Kazakhstan)
- Bedeliolus vigil Semenov, 1900 (Iran and Turkmenistan)
