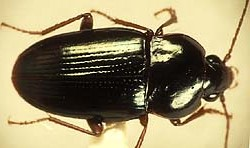

Scientific classification
- Domain: Eukaryota
- Kingdom: Animalia
- Phylum: Arthropoda
- Class: Insecta
- Order: Coleoptera
- Suborder: Adephaga
- Family: Carabidae
- Genus: Pogonus
- Species: P. texanus

Binomial name
- Pogonus texanus Chaudoir, 1868

= Pogonus texanus =

Species of beetle

Pogonus texanus is a species of ground beetle in the family Carabidae. It is found in North America.
