= Sirdenus =

Scientific classification
- Kingdom: Animalia
- Phylum: Arthropoda
- Class: Insecta
- Order: Coleoptera
- Suborder: Adephaga
- Family: Carabidae
- Subfamily: Trechinae
- Tribe: Pogonini
- Genus: Sirdenus; Dejean, 1828

Subgenera
- Sirdenus Dejean, 1828; Syrdenopsis Lutshnik, 1933

Synonyms
- Syrdenus

Genus of beetles

Sirdenus is a genus of ground beetles in the family Carabidae. There are about five described species in Sirdenus.

== Species ==
These five species belong to the genus Sirdenus:

- Sirdenus debilis Kryzhanovskij & Mikhailov, 1971 (Turkmenistan)
- Sirdenus filiformis (Dejean, 1828) (North Africa, Italy)
- Sirdenus grayii (Wollaston, 1862) (Africa, Asia, Europe)
- Sirdenus pallens Andrewes, 1935 (Pakistan)
- Sirdenus persianus Morvan, 1973 (Iran)
