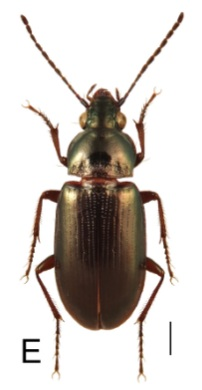

Scientific classification
- Kingdom: Animalia
- Phylum: Arthropoda
- Class: Insecta
- Order: Coleoptera
- Suborder: Adephaga
- Family: Carabidae
- Genus: Pogonus
- Species: P. riparius

Binomial name
- Pogonus riparius Dejean, 1828

Synonyms
- Pogonus (Pogonus) riparius Dejean, 1828

= Pogonus riparius =

Species of beetle

Pogonus riparius is a species of beetle of the family Carabidae. It is distributed along the Mediterranean coast of southern Europe, from Spain to Albania. It is also present on Cyprus. In Bulgaria, it is found along the coast of the Black Sea.

== Description ==
Adults reach a length of about 6–8 mm.

== Biology ==
This species occupies environments where plants of Arthrocnemetea grow. It has been observed that in some populations along the Adriatic coast, the different life phases of this species can overlap in the same year.
