= Nephalioides nigriventris =

Scientific classification
- Kingdom: Animalia
- Phylum: Arthropoda
- Class: Insecta
- Order: Coleoptera
- Suborder: Polyphaga
- Infraorder: Cucujiformia
- Family: Cerambycidae
- Genus: Nephalioides
- Species: N. nigriventris

Binomial name
- Nephalioides nigriventris (Bates, 1874)

Species of beetle

Nephalioides nigriventris is a species of beetle in the family Cerambycidae. It was described by Bates in 1874.
