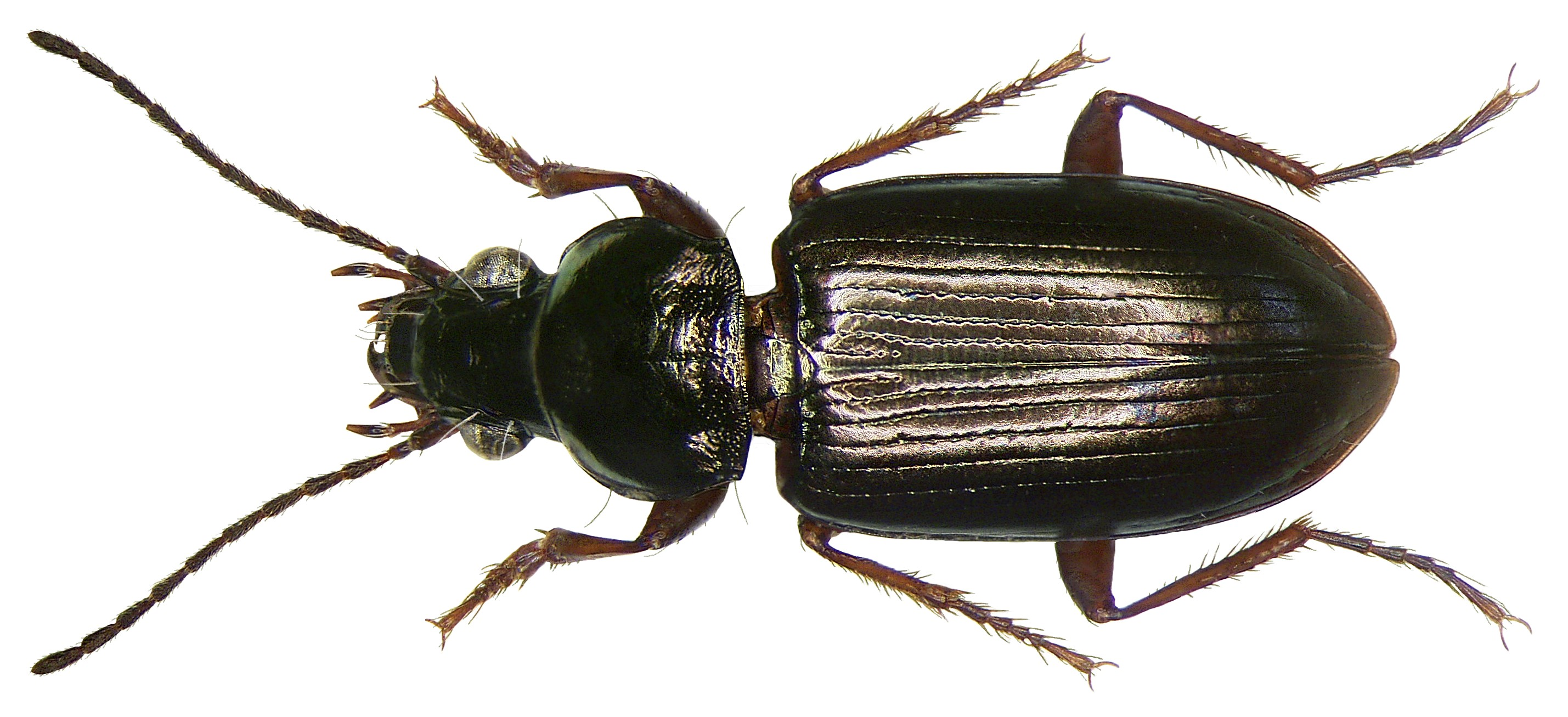
- Pogonus chalceus

Scientific classification
- Kingdom: Animalia
- Phylum: Arthropoda
- Class: Insecta
- Order: Coleoptera
- Suborder: Adephaga
- Family: Carabidae
- Subfamily: Trechinae
- Tribe: Pogonini
- Genus: Pogonus; Dejean, 1821

Subgenera
- Pogonoidius Carret, 1903; Pogonus Dejean, 1821

= Pogonus =

Genus of beetles

Pogonus is a genus of ground beetles in the family Carabidae, found worldwide. There are more than 50 described species in Pogonus.

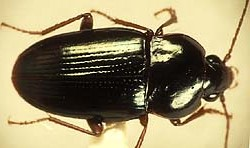
Pogonus texanus

== Species ==
These 57 species belong to the genus Pogonus:

- Pogonus andrewesi Lutshnik, 1934 (Mongolia)
- Pogonus apicalis Erichson, 1843 (Angola and Namibia)
- Pogonus approximans Fairmaire, 1888 (China)
- Pogonus australis Chaudoir, 1878 (Australia)
- Pogonus biroi Csiki, 1907 (India and Iraq)
- Pogonus bulgani Jedlicka, 1968 (Mongolia)
- Pogonus cardiotrachelus Chaudoir, 1872 (Australia)
- Pogonus castaneipes Fairmaire, 1888 (China)
- Pogonus chalceus (Marsham, 1802) (Europe, North Africa)
- Pogonus cumanus Lutshnik, 1916 (Palearctic)
- Pogonus dichrous Baehr, 2010 (Australia)
- Pogonus diplochaetoides Baehr, 1997 (Australia)
- Pogonus dostali Baehr, 2010 (Australia)
- Pogonus fasciatopunctatus A.Morawitz, 1862 (Russia)
- Pogonus fennelli Hudson, 2000 (Australia)
- Pogonus formosanus Jedlicka, 1956 (Taiwan and temperate Asia)
- Pogonus gilesi B.Moore, 1977 (Australia)
- Pogonus gilvipes Dejean, 1828 (Europe, Asia, Africa)
- Pogonus grossi B.Moore, 1977 (Australia)
- Pogonus hormozganicus Azadbakhsh, 2019 (Iran)
- Pogonus hypharpagioides Sloane, 1895 (Australia)
- Pogonus iridipennis Nicolai, 1822 (Europe, Asia)
- Pogonus itoshimaensis Habu, 1954 (Japan, Russia, South Korea)
- Pogonus japonicus Putzeys, 1875 (Japan and South Korea)
- Pogonus lamprus Wiedemann, 1823 (South Africa)
- Pogonus littoralis (Duftschmid, 1812) (Europe)
- Pogonus luridipennis (Germar, 1822) (Yellow Pogonus) (Europe, North Africa)
- Pogonus lutshniki Kryzhanovskij, 1990 (Turkmenistan)
- Pogonus matthewsi Baehr & Hudson, 2001 (Australia)
- Pogonus meridionalis Dejean, 1828 (Europe, western Asia)
- Pogonus micans Chaudoir, 1842 (southwest Asia)
- Pogonus minutus Dejean, 1828 (South Africa and Senegal/Gambia)
- Pogonus nigrescens Baehr, 1984 (Australia)
- Pogonus olivaceus Carret, 1903 (Bulgaria and Greece)
- Pogonus ordossicus Semenov, 1889 (China and Mongolia)
- Pogonus orientalis Dejean, 1828 (Palearctic)
- Pogonus pallidipennis Dejean, 1828 (France, Italy, and Spain)
- Pogonus peisonis Ganglbauer, 1891 (Europe)
- Pogonus perovalis Baehr & Hudson, 2001 (Australia)
- Pogonus pueli Lutshnik, 1935 (China)
- Pogonus punctifrons Reitter, 1908 (Cyprus, Israel, Turkey)
- Pogonus punctulatus Dejean, 1828 (Europe, Asia)
- Pogonus reticulatus Schaum, 1857 (Greece, Moldova, Ukraine)
- Pogonus riparius Dejean, 1828 (Europe)
- Pogonus rodolphi Alluaud, 1939 (Kenya)
- Pogonus saskiae Baehr, 1997 (Australia)
- Pogonus sauteri Jedlicka, 1956 (Taiwan and temperate Asia)
- Pogonus smaragdinus Waltl, 1835 (Morocco and Spain)
- Pogonus submarginatus Reitter, 1908 (Asia)
- Pogonus sumlini Baehr, 1999 (Australia)
- Pogonus syriacus Chaudoir, 1872 (Cyprus, Syria, and Turkey)
- Pogonus texanus Chaudoir, 1868 (North America)
- Pogonus transfuga Chaudoir, 1872 (Palearctic)
- Pogonus turkestanicus Lutshnik, 1935 (Kazakhstan)
- Pogonus variabilis B.Moore, 1991 (Australia)
- Pogonus vicinus Baehr & Hudson, 2001 (Australia)
- Pogonus zietzi Sloane, 1895 (Australia)
