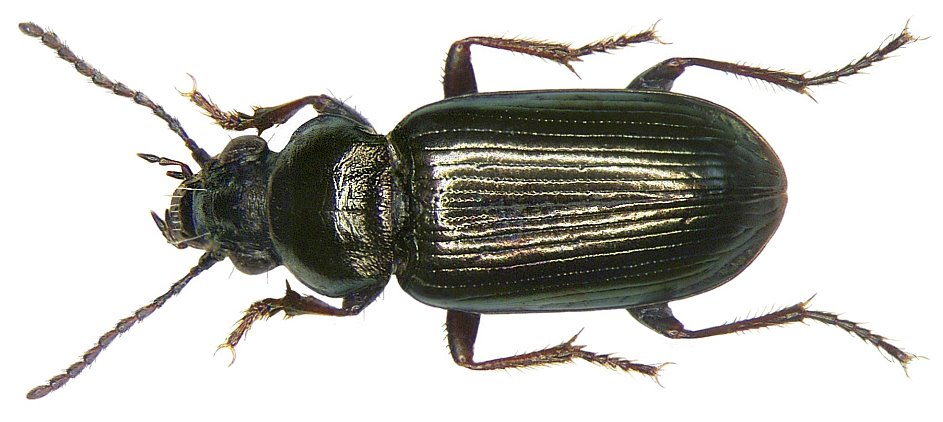
- Pogonus senegalensis, France

Scientific classification
- Kingdom: Animalia
- Phylum: Arthropoda
- Class: Insecta
- Order: Coleoptera
- Suborder: Adephaga
- Family: Carabidae
- Subfamily: Trechinae
- Tribe: Pogonini; Laporte, 1834

= Pogonini =

Tribe of beetles

Pogonini is a tribe of ground beetles in the family Carabidae. There are about 12 genera and more than 80 described species in Pogonini. More than half the species are in the genus Pogonus.

The species of Pogonini, except those in the South American genus Ochtozetus, live in saline habitats inland or along ocean coastlines.

== Genera ==
These 12 genera belong to the tribe Pogonini:

- Bedeliolus Semenov, 1900 (southwest Asia)
- Cardiaderus Dejean, 1828 (eastern Europe, western Asia.)
- Diodercarus Lutshnik, 1931 (Iraq, Saudi Arabia, Iran)
- Diplochaetus Chaudoir, 1872 (worldwide)
- Ochtozetus Chaudoir, 1872 (South America)
- Olegius Komarov, 1996 (Turkmenistan)
- Pogonistes Chaudoir, 1872 (worldwide)
- Pogonopsis Bedel, 1898 (Tunisia)
- Pogonus Dejean, 1821 (worldwide)
- Sirdenus Dejean, 1828 (worldwide)
- Syrdenoidius Baehr & Hudson, 2001 (Australia)
- Thalassotrechus Van Dyke, 1918 (United States, Mexico)
