= Olegius =

Scientific classification
- Domain: Eukaryota
- Kingdom: Animalia
- Phylum: Arthropoda
- Class: Insecta
- Order: Coleoptera
- Suborder: Adephaga
- Family: Carabidae
- Subfamily: Trechinae
- Tribe: Pogonini
- Genus: Olegius; Komarov, 1996
- Species: O. turkmenicus

Binomial name
- Olegius turkmenicus Komarov, 1996

Genus of beetles

Olegius is a genus of ground beetles in the family Carabidae. This genus has a single species, Olegius turkmenicus. It is found in Turkmenistan.
