= Ordishia klagesi =

Scientific classification
- Domain: Eukaryota
- Kingdom: Animalia
- Phylum: Arthropoda
- Class: Insecta
- Order: Lepidoptera
- Superfamily: Noctuoidea
- Family: Erebidae
- Subfamily: Arctiinae
- Genus: Ordishia
- Species: O. klagesi

Binomial name
- Ordishia klagesi (Rothschild, 1909)

Synonyms
- Automolis klagesi Rothschild, 1909

Species of moth

Ordishia klagesi is a moth of the family Erebidae first described by Walter Rothschild in 1909. It is found in French Guiana, Venezuela, Ecuador, Peru and Brazil.
