= Notolomus =

Scientific classification
- Kingdom: Animalia
- Phylum: Arthropoda
- Class: Insecta
- Order: Coleoptera
- Suborder: Polyphaga
- Infraorder: Cucujiformia
- Family: Curculionidae
- Tribe: Derelomini
- Genus: Notolomus; LeConte, 1876

Genus of beetles

Notolomus is a genus of true weevils in the beetle family Curculionidae. There are at least two described species in Notolomus.

== Species ==
These two species belong to the genus Notolomus:

- Notolomus basalis LeConte, 1876
- Notolomus bicolor LeConte, 1876
