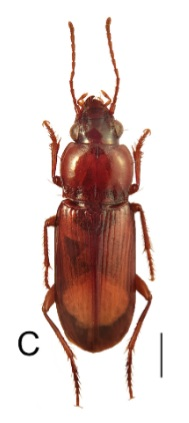
- Pogonus testaceus testaceus

Scientific classification
- Kingdom: Animalia
- Phylum: Arthropoda
- Class: Insecta
- Order: Coleoptera
- Suborder: Adephaga
- Family: Carabidae
- Genus: Pogonistes
- Species: P. testaceus

Binomial name
- Pogonistes testaceus (Dejean, 1828)

Synonyms
- Pogonus gracilis Dejean, 1828

= Pogonistes testaceus =

Species of beetle

Pogonistes testaceus is a species of beetle of the family Carabidae. It is found in North Africa, on the Iberian Peninsula and along the French coast, as well as in Bulgaria and Greece.

== Description ==
Adults reach a length of about 5.5–6 mm.

== Biology ==
The species seems to prefer the most high-saline environments, which could explain why its distribution in the Iberian Peninsula is restricted to the Mediterranean coast. Adults are present all year, with a peak of activity in spring.

== Subspecies ==
- Pogonus testaceus testaceus (North Africa, the Iberian Peninsula and along the French coast)
- Pogonus testaceus graecus (Apfelbeck, 1904) (Bulgaria, Greece)
