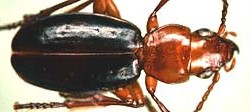
- Thalassotrechus barbarae

Scientific classification
- Domain: Eukaryota
- Kingdom: Animalia
- Phylum: Arthropoda
- Class: Insecta
- Order: Coleoptera
- Suborder: Adephaga
- Family: Carabidae
- Subfamily: Trechinae
- Tribe: Pogonini
- Genus: Thalassotrechus; Van Dyke, 1918
- Species: T. barbarae

Binomial name
- Thalassotrechus barbarae (G.Horn, 1892)

= Thalassotrechus =

Genus of beetles

Thalassotrechus is a genus of ground beetles in the family Carabidae. This genus has a single species, Thalassotrechus barbarae. It is found in Mexico and the United States.
