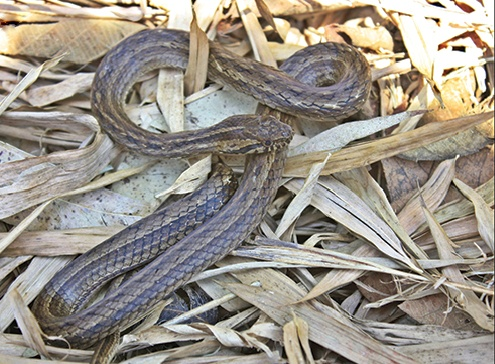

Conservation status
- Least Concern (IUCN 3.1)

Scientific classification
- Kingdom: Animalia
- Phylum: Chordata
- Class: Reptilia
- Order: Squamata
- Suborder: Serpentes
- Family: Colubridae
- Genus: Mesotes
- Species: M. strigatus

Binomial name
- Mesotes strigatus (Günther, 1858)

= Mesotes strigatus =

Species of snake

Mesotes strigatus, the coastal house snake, is a species of snake in the family Colubridae. The species is native to Argentina, Uruguay, Paraguay, and Brazil.
