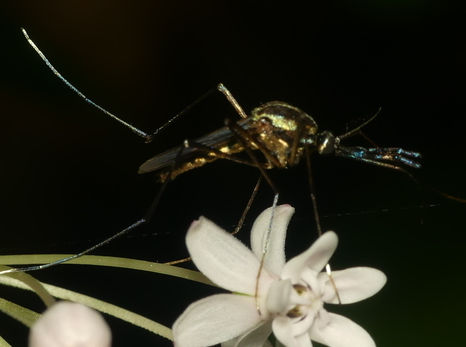

Scientific classification
- Domain: Eukaryota
- Kingdom: Animalia
- Phylum: Arthropoda
- Class: Insecta
- Order: Diptera
- Family: Culicidae
- Genus: Toxorhynchites
- Species: T. rutilus
- Subspecies: T. r. septentrionalis

Trinomial name
- Toxorhynchites rutilus septentrionalis Dyar & Knab, 1906

= Toxorhynchites rutilus septentrionalis =

Subspecies of fly

Toxorhynchites rutilus septentrionalis is a subspecies of T. rutilus. It can be found in North America.
