= Pogonopsis =

Scientific classification
- Domain: Eukaryota
- Kingdom: Animalia
- Phylum: Arthropoda
- Class: Insecta
- Order: Coleoptera
- Suborder: Adephaga
- Family: Carabidae
- Subfamily: Trechinae
- Tribe: Pogonini
- Genus: Pogonopsis; Bedel, 1898
- Species: P. pallida

Binomial name
- Pogonopsis pallida Bedel, 1898

Genus of beetles

Pogonopsis is a genus of ground beetles in the family Carabidae. This genus has a single species, Pogonopsis pallida. It is found in Tunisia.
