= Nephalioides rutilus =

Scientific classification
- Kingdom: Animalia
- Phylum: Arthropoda
- Class: Insecta
- Order: Coleoptera
- Suborder: Polyphaga
- Infraorder: Cucujiformia
- Family: Cerambycidae
- Genus: Nephalioides
- Species: N. rutilus

Binomial name
- Nephalioides rutilus (Bates, 1872)

Species of beetle

Nephalioides rutilus is a species of beetle in the family Cerambycidae. It was described by Bates in 1872.
