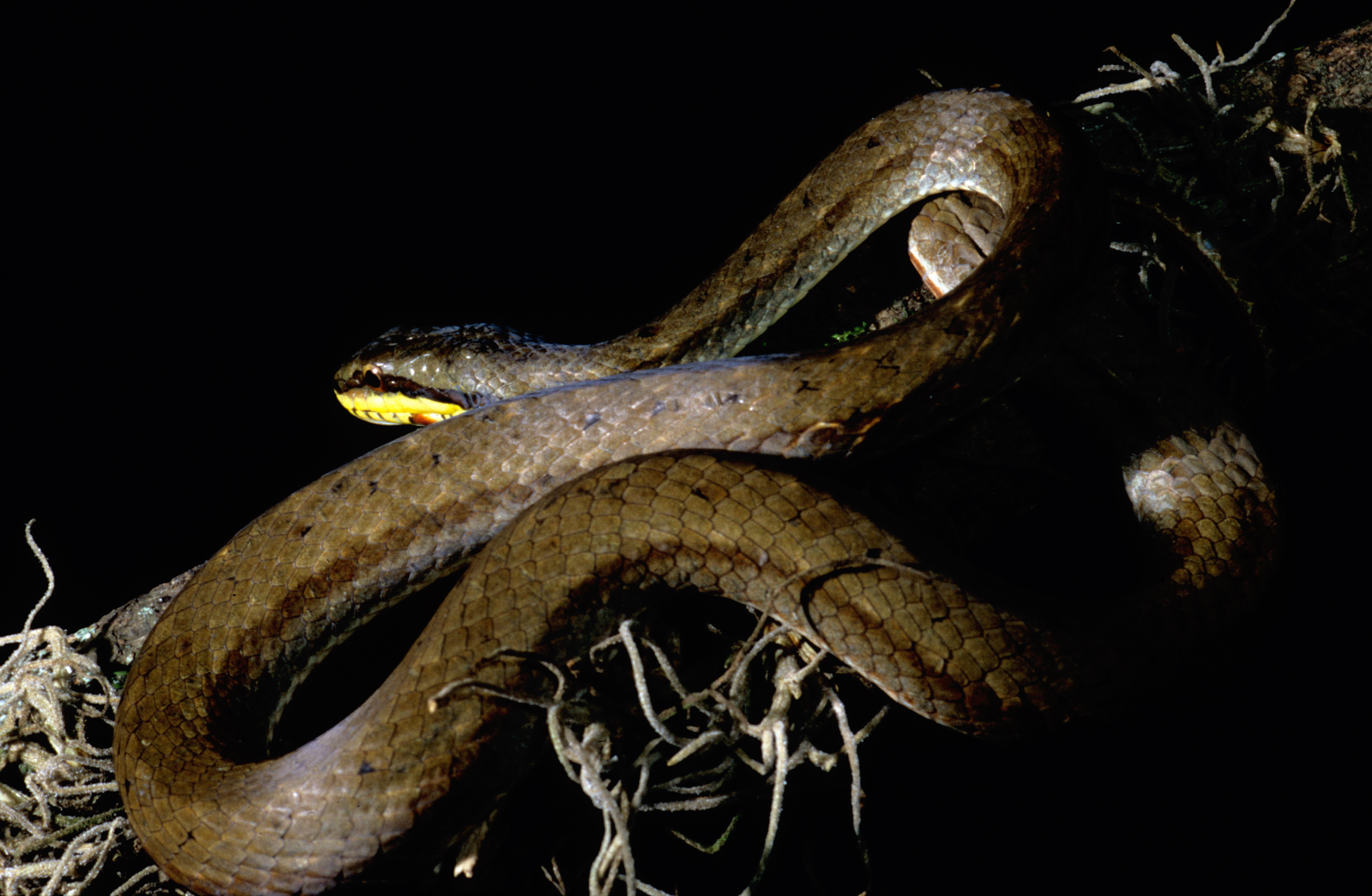

Conservation status
- Least Concern (IUCN 3.1)

Scientific classification
- Kingdom: Animalia
- Phylum: Chordata
- Class: Reptilia
- Order: Squamata
- Suborder: Serpentes
- Family: Colubridae
- Genus: Mesotes
- Species: M. rutilus

Binomial name
- Mesotes rutilus (Prado, 1942)

= Mesotes rutilus =

Species of snake

Mesotes rutilus, commonly known as Prado's coastal house snake, is a species of snake in the family Colubridae. The species is endemic to Brazil.
