= Phyllotrox rutilus =

Scientific classification
- Domain: Eukaryota
- Kingdom: Animalia
- Phylum: Arthropoda
- Class: Insecta
- Order: Coleoptera
- Suborder: Polyphaga
- Infraorder: Cucujiformia
- Family: Curculionidae
- Genus: Phyllotrox
- Species: P. rutilus

Binomial name
- Phyllotrox rutilus (Fall, 1913)

Species of beetle

Phyllotrox rutilus is a species of true weevil in the beetle family Curculionidae. It is found in North America.
