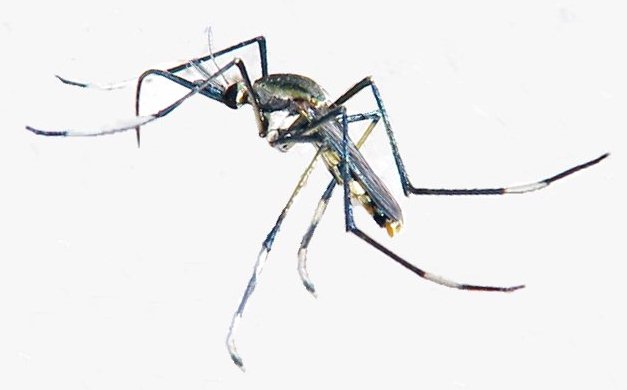
- Toxorhynchites speciosus
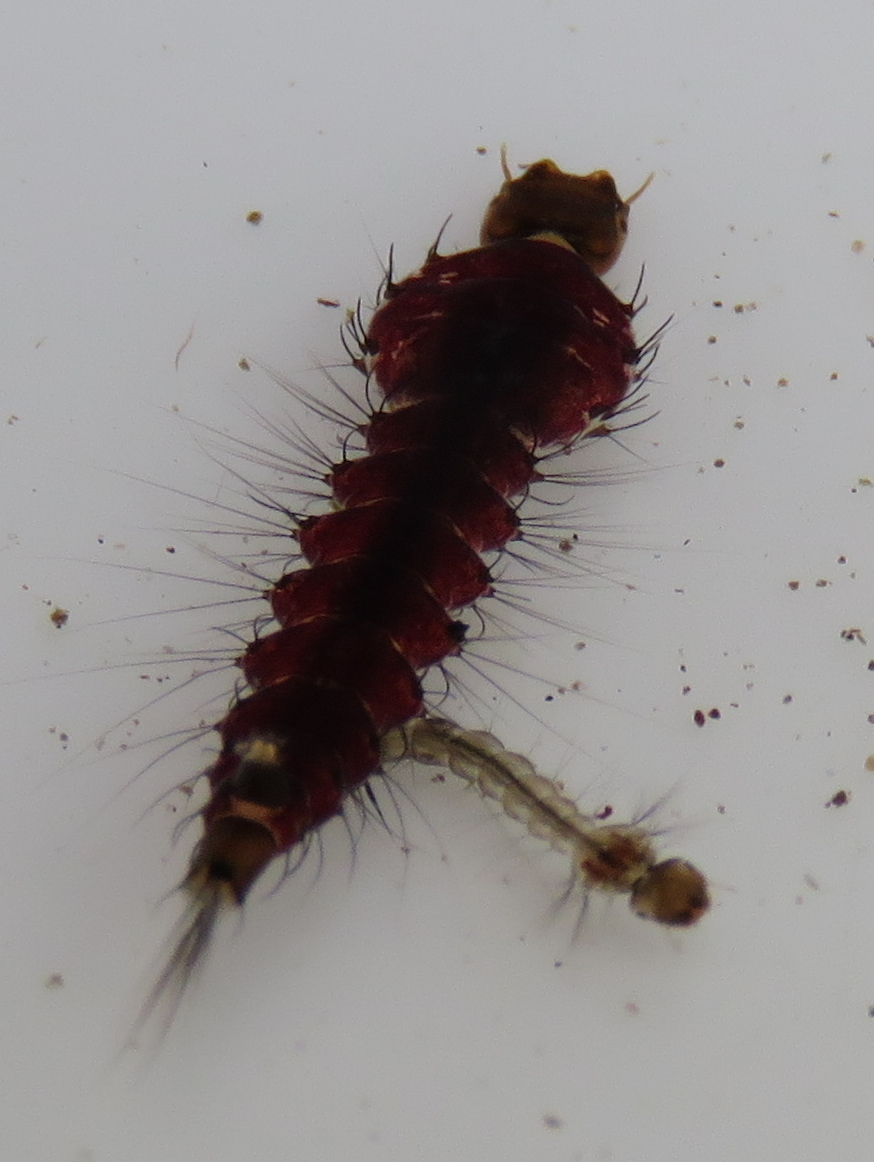
- Toxorhynchites speciosus larvae

Scientific classification
- Kingdom: Animalia
- Phylum: Arthropoda
- Clade: Pancrustacea
- Class: Insecta
- Order: Diptera
- Family: Culicidae
- Subfamily: Culicinae
- Tribe: Toxorhynchitini
- Genus: Toxorhynchites; Theobald, 1901

Species
- See text.

= Toxorhynchites =

Toxorhynchites Temporal range: Miocene–Present

Genus of flies

Toxorhynchites, also called elephant mosquitoes or mosquito eaters, is a genus of diurnal and often relatively colorful mosquitoes, found worldwide between about 35° north and 35° south. Most species occur in forests. It includes the largest known species of mosquito, at up to 18 mm (0.71 in) in length and 24 mm (0.94 in) in wingspan. It is among the few kinds of mosquito that do not consume blood. The adults subsist on carbohydrate-rich materials, such as honeydew, or saps and juices from damaged plants, refuse, fruit, and nectar.

Mating in mid-air, males and females synchronize their wing beats to the same frequency. Eggs are deposited by flinging them onto water surfaces while hovering. They are either white or yellow in color, with an incubation period of 40–60 hours depending on the temperature. The older the female mosquito, the less likely the eggs will be healthy.

In contrast to blood-sucking species of mosquitoes, their larvae prey on the larvae of other mosquitoes and similar nektonic prey, making Toxorhynchites beneficial to humans. Living on this protein and fat rich diet, females have no need to risk their lives sucking blood in adulthood, having already accumulated the necessary materials for oogenesis and vitellogenesis. The larvae of one jungle variety, Toxorhynchites splendens, consume larvae of other mosquito species occurring in tree crevices, particularly Aedes aegypti.

Environmental scientists have suggested that Toxorhynchites mosquitoes be introduced to areas outside their natural range in order to fight dengue fever. This has been practiced historically, but errors have been made. For example, when intending to introduce T. splendens to new areas, scientists actually introduced T. amboinensis.

An extinct species T. mexicanus is known from Miocene age Mexican amber.

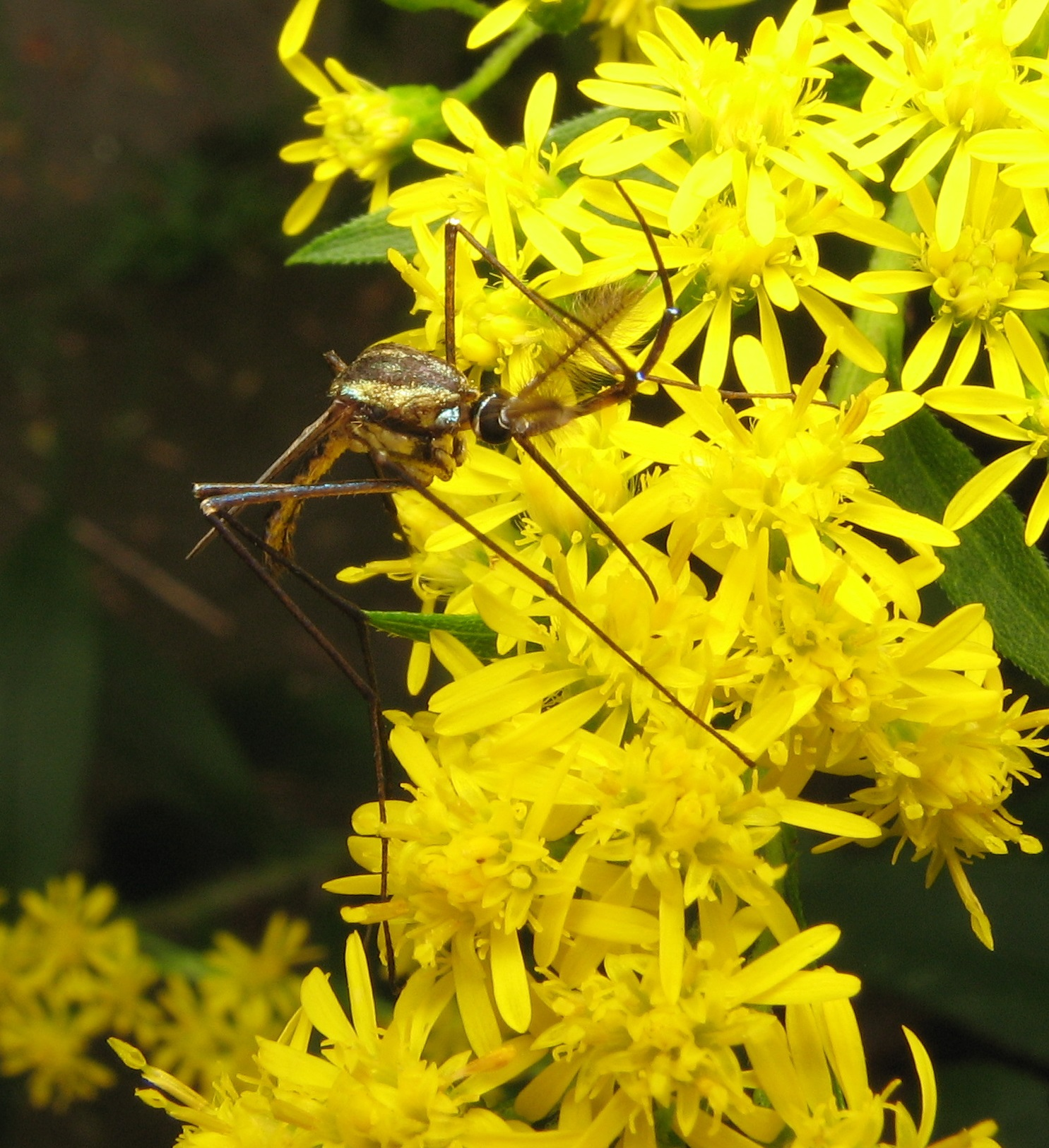
Male T. rutilus on goldenrod

== Species ==
The genus Toxorhynchites is divided into 4 subgenera and contains 90 species also including 1 extinct species:

=== Subgenus (Toxorhynchites) ===
- Toxorhynchites acaudatus (Leicester, 1908)
- Toxorhynchites albipes (Edwards, 1922)
- Toxorhynchites amboinensis (Doleschall, 1857)
- Toxorhynchites angustiplatus Evenhuis and Steffan, 1986
- Toxorhynchites ater (Daniels, 1908)
- Toxorhynchites auranticauda Lane, 1992
- Toxorhynchites auripes Edwards, 1935
- Toxorhynchites barbipes Edwards, 1913
- Toxorhynchites bengalensis Rosenberg and Evenhuis, 1985
- Toxorhynchites bickleyi Thurman, 1959
- Toxorhynchites brevipalpis Theobald, 1991

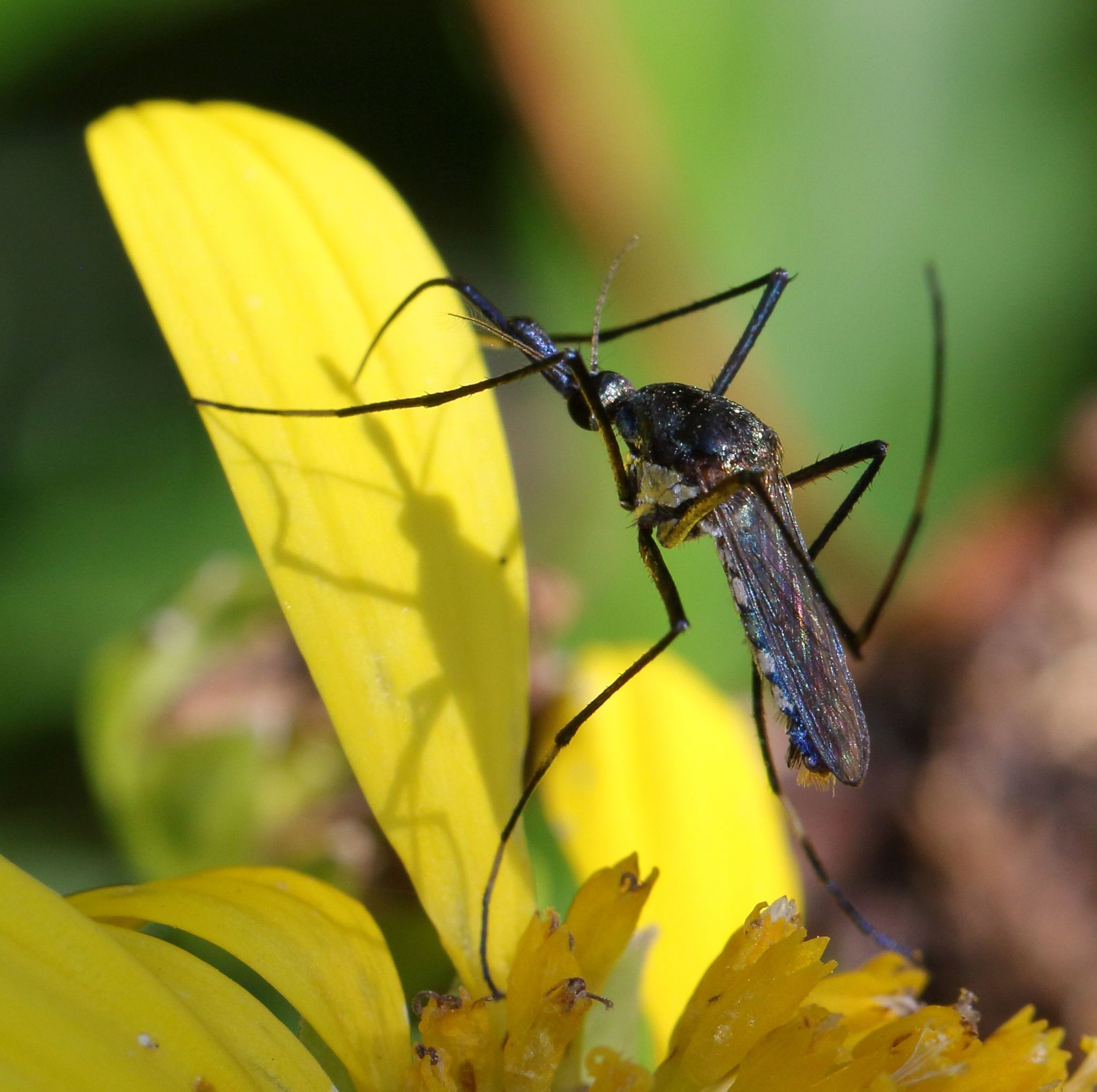
T. brevipalpis

- Toxorhynchites camaronis Ribeiro, 1991
- Toxorhynchites christophi Portschinsky, 1884
- Toxorhynchites coeruleus (Brug, 1934)
- Toxorhynchites darjeelingensis Tyagi, Munirathinam, Krishnamoorthy et al., 2015
- Toxorhynchites dundo Ribeiro, 1991}
- Toxorhynchites edwardsi (Barraud, 1924)
- Toxorhynchites evansae (Edwards, 1936)
- Toxorhynchites funestus (Leicester, 1908)
- Toxorhynchites gigantulus Dyar & Shannon, 1925
- Toxorhynchites gravelyi (Edwards, 1921)
- Toxorhynchites indicus Evenhuis and Steffan, 1986
- Toxorhynchites inornatus (Walker, 1865)
- Toxorhynchites kempi (Edwards, 1921)
- Toxorhynchites klossi (Edwards, 1921)
- Toxorhynchites leicesteri Theobald, 1904
- Toxorhynchites lewisi Ribeiro, 1991
- Toxorhynchites macaensis Ribeiro, 1997
- Toxorhynchites magnificus (Leicester, 1908)
- Toxorhynchites manicatus (Edwards, 1921)
- Toxorhynchites manopi Thurman, 1959
- Toxorhynchites metallicus Leicester, 1904
- Toxorhynchites minimus (Theobald, 1905)
- Toxorhynchites nepenthicola Steffan and Evenhuis, 1982
- Toxorhynchites nepenthis (Dyar and Shannon, 1925)
- Toxorhynchites nigripes (Edwards, 1935)
- Toxorhynchites okinawensis Toma, Miyagi and Tanaka, 1990
- Toxorhynchites pendleburyi (Edwards, 1930)
- Toxorhynchites phytophagus Theobald, 1909
- Toxorhynchites quasiferox (Leicester, 1908)
- Toxorhynchites rajah Tsukamoto, 1986
- Toxorhynchites ramalingami Evenhuis and Steffan, 1986
- Toxorhynchites raris (Leicester, 1908)

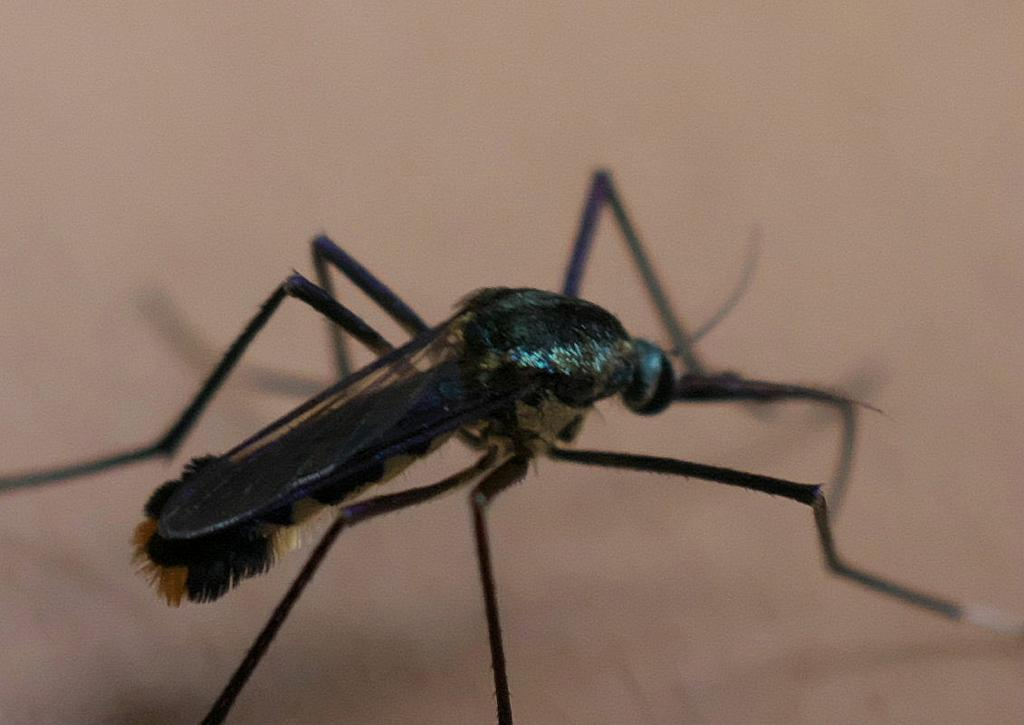
T. towadensis

- Toxorhynchites rickenbachi Ribeiro, 1991
- Toxorhynchites rodhaini Ribeiro, 1991
- Toxorhynchites speciosus (Skuse, 1889)
- Toxorhynchites splendens (Wiedemann, 1819)
- Toxorhynchites sumatranus (Brug, 1939)
- Toxorhynchites sunthorni Thurman, 1959
- Toxorhynchites towadensis (Matsumara, 1916)
- Toxorhynchites tyagii Krishnamoorthy et al., 2013
- Toxorhynchites domrey Maquart & Rahola,2023

=== Subgenus (Afrorhynchus) ===
- Toxorhynchites aeneus (Evans, 1926)
- Toxorhynchites angolensis Ribeiro, 1992
- Toxorhynchites brunhesi Ribeiro, 2004
- Toxorhynchites capelai Ribeiro, 1992
- Toxorhynchites erythrurus (Edwards, 1941)
- Toxorhynchites fontenillei Ribeiro, 2004
- Toxorhynchites grjebinei Ribeiro, 2004
- Toxorhynchites helenae Ribeiro, 1992
- Toxorhynchites kaimosi (van Someren, 1946)
- Toxorhynchites lemuriae Ribeiro, 2004
- Toxorhynchites lutescens (Theobald, 1901)
- Toxorhynchites madagascarensis Ribeiro, 2004
- Toxorhynchites nairobiensis (van Someren, 1946)
- Toxorhynchites nigeriensis Ribeiro, 2005
- Toxorhynchites pauliani (Doucet, 1951)
- Toxorhynchites ruwenzori (van Someren, 1948)
- Toxorhynchites viridibasis (Edwards, 1935)
- Toxorhynchites wolfsi Ribeiro, 2005
- Toxorhynchites zairensis Ribeiro, 2005

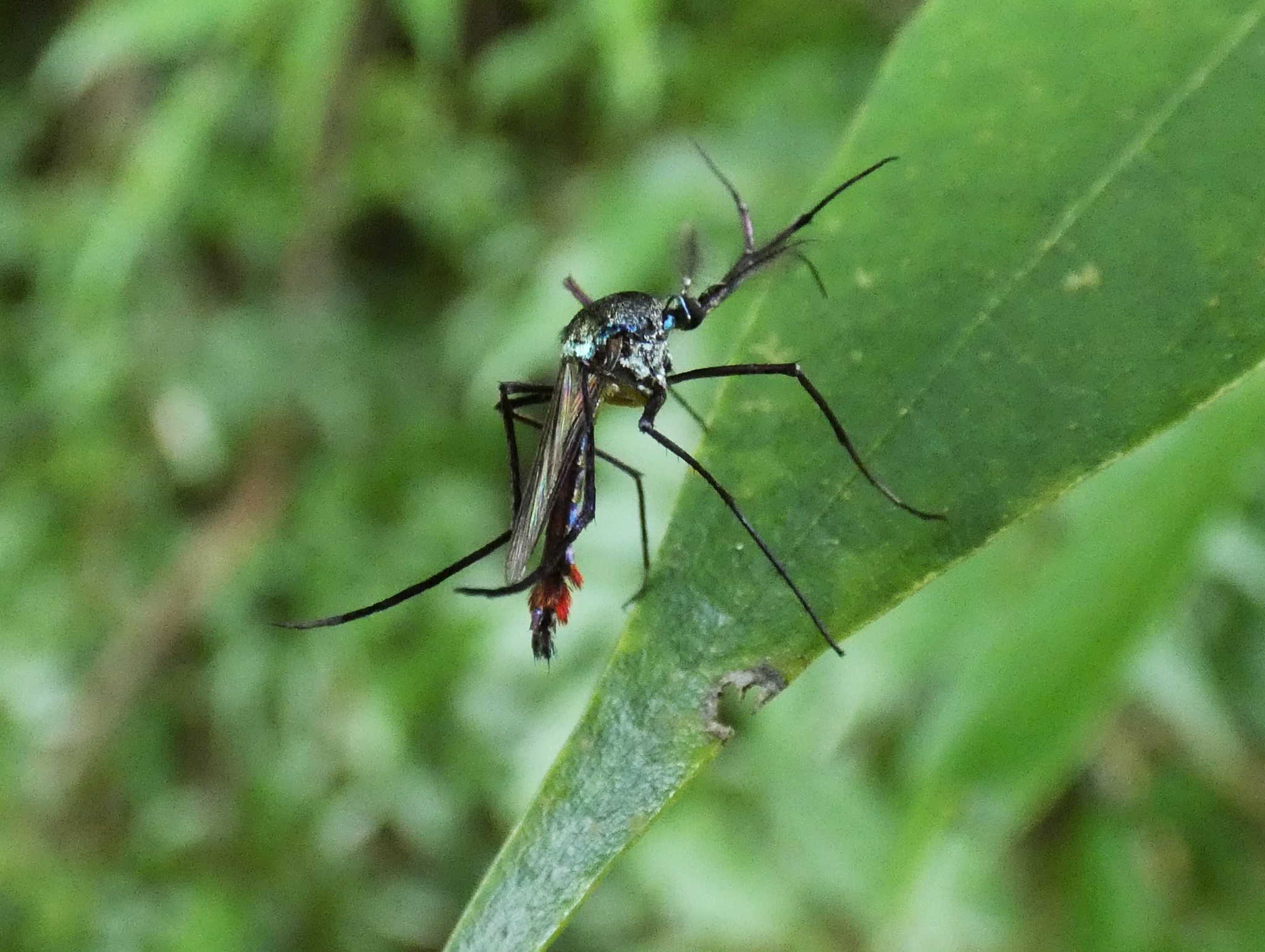
T. haemorrhoidalis

=== Subgenus (Ankylorhynchus) ===
- Toxorhynchites catharinensis (da Costa Lima, Guitoon and Ferreira, 1962)
- Toxorhynchites hexacis Martini, 1901
- Toxorhynchites purpureus Theobald, 1901
- Toxorhynchites trichopygus Wiedemann, 1828

=== Subgenus (Lynchiella) ===
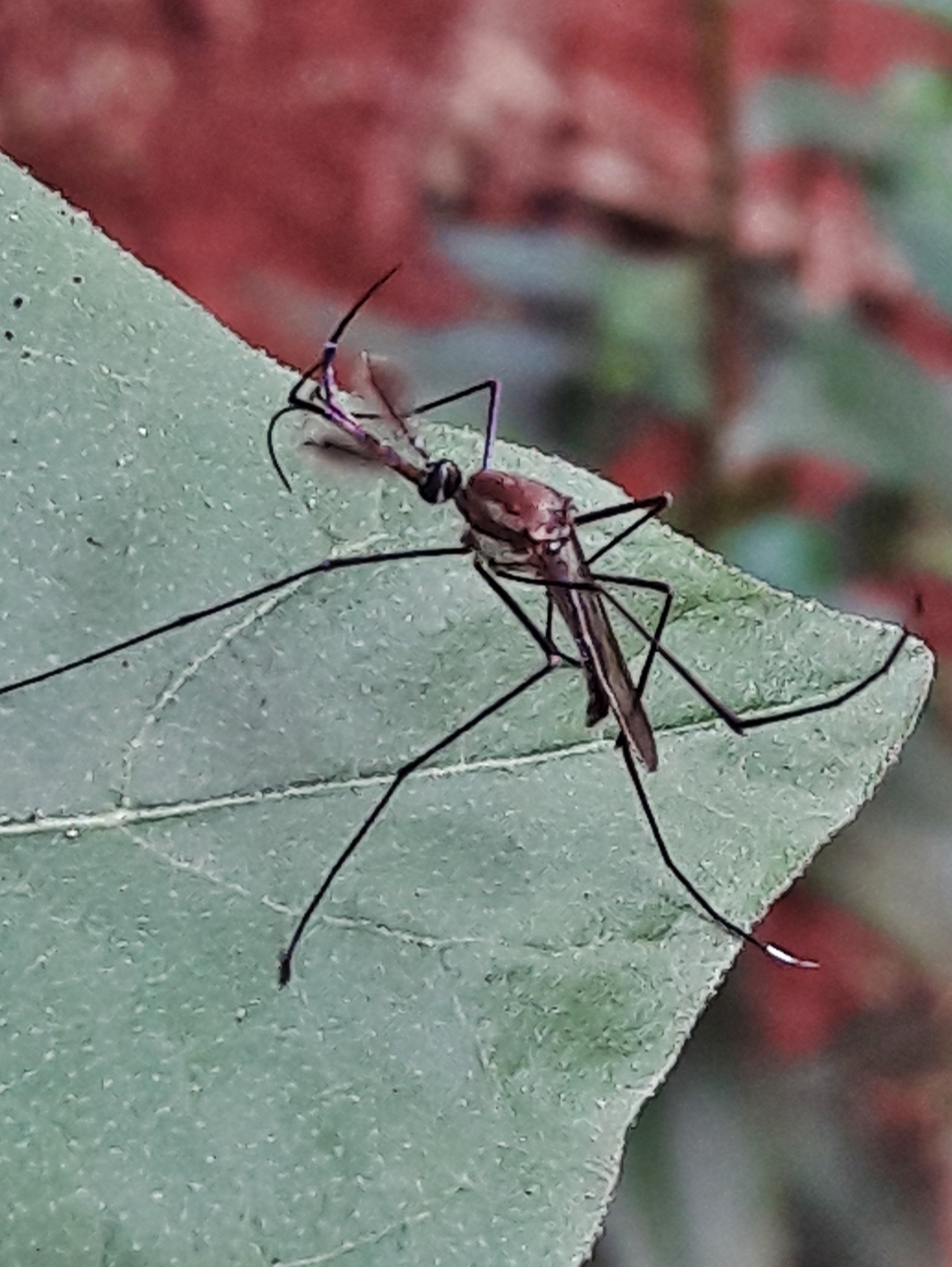
T. theobaldi

- Toxorhynchites bambusicola Lutz and Neiva, 1913
- Toxorhynchites cavalierii García and Casal, 1967
- Toxorhynchites gerbergi Belkin, 1977
- Toxorhynchites grandiosus Williston, 1900
- Toxorhynchites guadeloupensis Dyar and Knab, 1906
- Toxorhynchites haemorrhoidalis Fabricius, 1787
- Toxorhynchites hypoptes (Knab, 1907)
- Toxorhynchites mariae Bourroul, 1904
- Toxorhynchites moctezuma Dyar and Knab, 1906
- Toxorhynchites portoricensis Roeder, 1885
- Toxorhynchites pusillus Lima, 1931
- Toxorhynchites rizzoi (de Deus Palma and Galvão, 1969)
- Toxorhynchites rutilus Coquillett, 1896
- Toxorhynchites solstitialis Lutz, 1904
- Toxorhynchites theobaldi Dyar and Knab, 1906
- Toxorhynchites violaceus Wiedemann, 1821
- Toxorhynchites caatingensis Andrade & Corte, 2021
