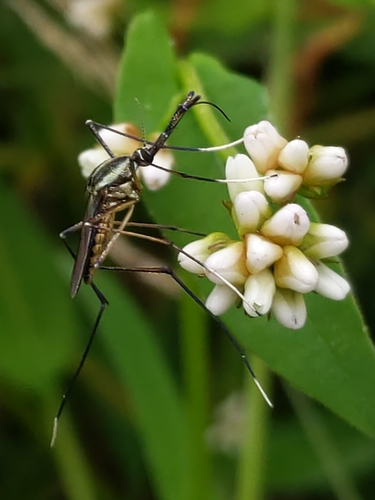

Scientific classification
- Kingdom: Animalia
- Phylum: Arthropoda
- Clade: Pancrustacea
- Class: Insecta
- Order: Diptera
- Family: Culicidae
- Genus: Toxorhynchites
- Species: T. rutilus

Binomial name
- Toxorhynchites rutilus (Coquillett, 1896)

Synonyms
- Megarhinus rutila Coquillett, 1896

= Toxorhynchites rutilus =

Species of fly

Toxorhynchites rutilus, also known as the elephant mosquito or treehole predatory mosquito, is a species of mosquito in the family Culicidae. Unlike most species in the genus that populate the tropics, Tx. rutilus is endemic to temperate regions. As their name suggests, these mosquitoes commonly lay their eggs in treeholes where their larvae are predators on a variety of arthropods. As with other mosquitoes, they also inhabit other bodies of stagnant water such as in a tire or artificial containers, but not large bodies of water like ponds and ground pools. Females are able to strategically locate breeding sites that already contain prey to oviposit in.

Tx. rutilus feeding behaviors make them strikingly different from a typical mosquito. Both adult males and females are strictly nectar-feeding and so they do not have a role in the transmission of pathogens to animals as in other mosquitoes. Instead, their larvae are predacious and could potentially help curb the spread of diseases via vector mosquitoes. While they commonly prey on copepods, rotifers, ostracods, and chironomids, they also generally have a preference for certain species of mosquito larvae including common disease vectors such as Aedes albopictus, Aedes aegypti, and Aedes polynesiensis. If their habitat lacks food or is overcrowded, the larvae are known to succumb to cannibalism. Their larval feeding preferences make them of special interest to biological control scientists and entomologists. There have been few successful instances of using Tx. rutilus as biological control in regions such as Hawaii, Florida, Louisiana, and Japan.

== Taxonomy ==
Tx. rutilus is placed under subgenus Lynchiella.

There are two subspecies under Tx. rutilus:

- Toxorhynchites rutilus rutilus
- Toxorhynchites rutilus septentrionalis

While the phylogenetics of the genus Toxorhynchites have not been completely studied, several phylogenetic studies using a variety of targets including the white gene, ribosomal DNA, and small subunit ribosomal DNA placed Toxorhynchites as its own subfamily sister to Culicinae. However, other studies using mitochondrial DNA confidently places the genus within Culicinae. It is worth continuing the investigation of the phylogenetics to help understand how herbivory arose in the genus.

The genome of Tx. r. septentrionalis is partially available on GenBank.

== Description ==
Tx. rutilus is one of the largest species of mosquitoes. The adults can grow up to 7 mm in length and 12 mm in wingspan, and the fourth larval instar can grow to 20 mm, comparable to the diameter of a penny. Unlike most other mosquitoes, adult males and females are roughly the same size. Even though they have a global distribution, all 91 described species of Toxorhynchites have very similar morphological characters, making them hard to identify to species level.

Like most others in the genus, Tx. rutilus has a characteristically strongly recurved proboscis. The adult mosquitoes have iridescent purple and golden scales on their abdomen, wings, and legs. Their femur is mostly dark-scaled, while the tarsi are mostly white. The larvae are generally dark brown or red, with conspicuous hairs on the abdomen.

== Natural history ==
Like all mosquitoes, Tx. rutilus is holometabolous, meaning they undergo complete metamorphosis over four life stages - egg, larva, pupa, adult.

=== Adult and egg ===
The adults of Tx. rutilus are strictly nectar-feeding, but there have been no studies on their nectar preferences or on their role in pollination. Their salivary glands are morphologically different from those genus such as Aedes, Anopheles, and Culex mosquitoes. This is interesting from an evolutionary and disease control perspective as the salivary glands in the later genus play an important role in disease transmission. Future studies could look into the development of transgenic mutants resistant to pathogens.

Since the adult mosquitoes do not feed on blood, all the proteins and fats required for successful oogenesis is acquired from the larval diet. Some amino acids are obtained from the nectar. The adult female's reproductive follicles mature continuously over several days, allowing her to lay eggs over many days with an average of 1.0 to 3.2 eggs each day. Eggs are laid in flight by launching or dropping them into a chosen suitable habitat. Before laying each egg, she flies in counterclockwise loops that progressively become smaller as she nears the water body until she is close enough to eject her egg. This process is repeated until she is done laying all her mature eggs. Because the eggs are hydrophobic, they float on the surface of the water where they incubate for 24 to 50 hours, depending on the subspecies and temperature. Tx. r. rutilus tends to have a longer hatch time than Tx. r. septentrionalis. The eggs are susceptible to desiccation, so the female chooses a oviposition site that is not exposed to strong winds that may blow her eggs away. Females have demonstrated preference to sheltered and dark colored oviposition sites (black, brown, blue, red) over bright colored ones (white, yellow, green). This makes them a worse candidate for biological control than other Toxorhynchites species, especially in urban areas where common target breeding sites will be brightly colored man-made containers.

=== Larvae and pupae ===
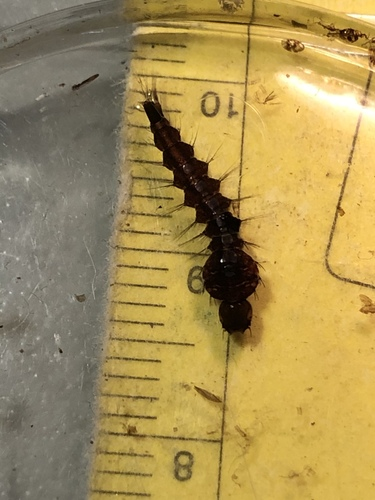
Toxorhynchites rutilus larvae

Tx. rutilus larvae are sensitive to temperature and humidity. The subspecies Tx. r. rutilus typically spend 12 to 18 days in their larval stage and pupate for about six days, while Tx. r. septentrionalis spend 11 to 16 days as larvae. In warmer temperatures, they tend to go through their larval stages faster. Males pupate 1–2 days before females.

Larvae use mechanoreceptors to detect and ambush moving prey and have modified mandibular mouthparts for predation. Tx. r. septentrionalis hunts more commonly at the surface of the water. While it is thought that Tx. rutilus larvae have a diet preference, there is no strong data to support their preference. Still, it is commonly reported that they predate on anything, including their siblings. Especially in overcrowded habitats, the larvae commonly cannibalize each other to reduce competition. High rates of cannibalism are also attributed to the fact that the larvae often swim backwards. The accidental bumping into each other sees a higher rate of cannibalism than when they meet head-on.

Natural prey of the larvae include the eastern treehole mosquito Aedes triseriatus.

To survive the reduced prey available during the colder months, the larvae overwinter in their fourth instar and typically weigh more. Diapause is induced when the first instar larvae experiences shorter periods of daylight, not from a decrease in temperature.

Certain Toxorhynchites species, including Tx. r. septentrionalis, exhibit an odd behavior called prepupal compulsive killing. This is when the larvae kill prey but do not consume any of it. It is thought that this would help limit any harm that could be done to the vulnerable pupae. The behavior begins three to four days before pupation, and is most intense right before pupation.

== Biological control ==
Tx. rutilus have been successfully released into areas including Hawaii and Gainesville, Florida to significantly decrease the natural populations of vector mosquitoes including Aedes and Culex species. Although it is thought that the larvae has preference for different species of mosquito prey, there has not been extensive studies on the hypothesis. A study showed that the larvae did not exhibit preference between Ae. aegypti and Cx. quinquefasciatus. It is difficult to introduce the species to new areas because of their sensitivity to their environment and their behavior. Because of their low egg laying rate, long larval development, and tendency to cannibalize their siblings, not many adults exist at a single time. This small population makes it difficult to produce enough larvae to prey on the much larger populations of vector mosquitoes. Tx. rutilus thus cannot single-handedly control mosquito populations, but must be used in combination to other mosquito control methods such as insecticides. Care must be taken in the timing of applying pesticides as the species are also susceptible to commonly used insecticides.

A strategy to help boost the population of Toxorhynchites is to rear the species in the lab and release them to the field. This was successfully implemented in New Orleans, Louisiana in the 1980s.

=== Rearing ===
The risk of cannibalism makes rearing in a lab inefficient and costly as each larva would have to be reared individually. As such, a lab in Texas successfully reared each Tx. rutilus larvae in individual wells. The hatchlings were fed with Panagrellus worms, and then later on switched to a mixture of worm and other mosquito and fly larvae. For efficiency and productivity, the lab did not feed the Tx. rutilus larvae solely on live prey mosquitoes.

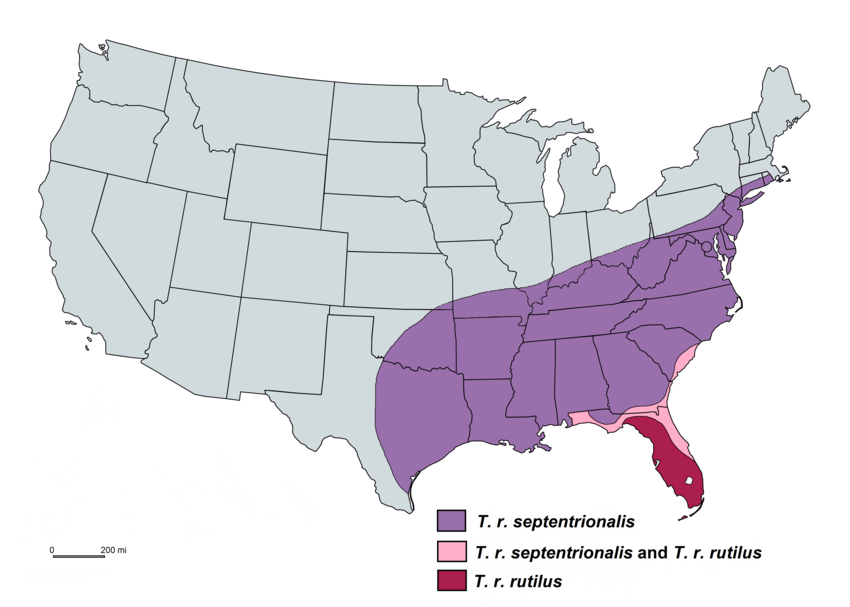
The geographical distribution of Toxorhynchites rutilus in the United States. Map is redrawn after Burkett-Cadena 2013. Credit: Abdullah A. Alomar, UF/IFAS

== Distribution ==
Species in the subgenera Lynchiella are present in the New World. While most of its species are tropical, Tx. rutilus is one of its few temperate species. Tx. rutilus are native to the Southern United States, covering regions in Florida and South Carolina.

The subspecies Tx. r. septentrionalis has a wider distribution than Tx. r. rutilus. It is found as north as Southern Canada, and as West as Texas.
