= Ariefusus rutilus =

Scientific classification
- Kingdom: Animalia
- Phylum: Mollusca
- Class: Gastropoda
- Subclass: Caenogastropoda
- Order: Neogastropoda
- Family: Fasciolariidae
- Genus: Ariefusus
- Species: A. rutilus

Binomial name
- Ariefusus rutilus (Nicolay & Berthelot, 1996)

Synonyms
- Fusinus rutilus Nicolay & Berthelot, 1996 (original combination)

Species of gastropod

Ariefusus rutilus is a species of sea snail, a marine gastropod mollusc in the family Fasciolariidae, the spindle snails, the tulip snails and their allies.

== Distribution ==
This marine species occur off Gabon.
