= Diplochaetus rutilus =

Scientific classification
- Domain: Eukaryota
- Kingdom: Animalia
- Phylum: Arthropoda
- Class: Insecta
- Order: Coleoptera
- Suborder: Adephaga
- Family: Carabidae
- Genus: Diplochaetus
- Species: D. rutilus

Binomial name
- Diplochaetus rutilus (Chevrolat, 1863)

Synonyms
- Diplochaetus lecontei (G. Horn, 1876)

Species of beetle

Diplochaetus rutilus is a species of ground beetle in the family Carabidae. It is found in the Caribbean Sea, and Central, North, and South America.
