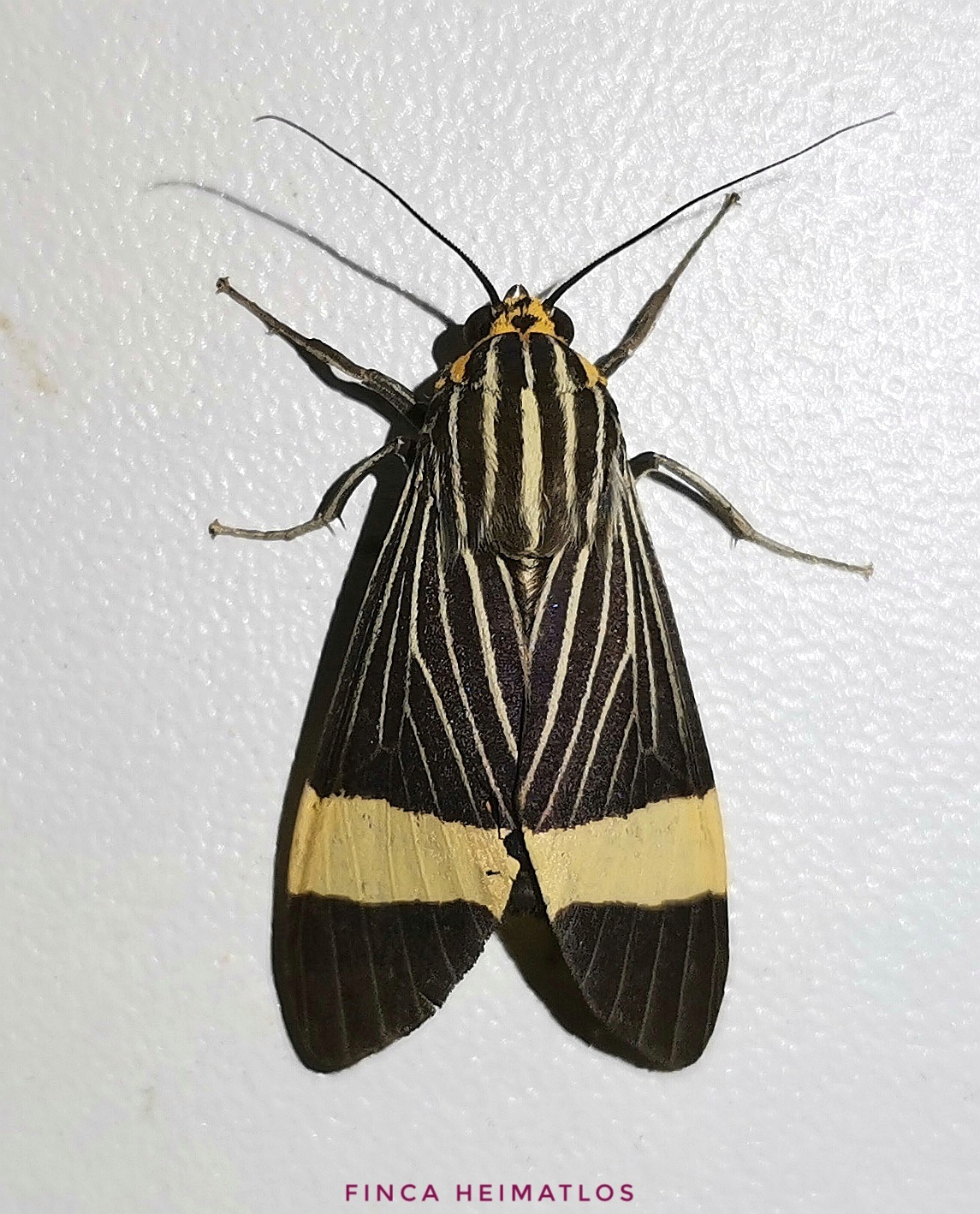
- Ordishia rutilus

Scientific classification
- Domain: Eukaryota
- Kingdom: Animalia
- Phylum: Arthropoda
- Class: Insecta
- Order: Lepidoptera
- Superfamily: Noctuoidea
- Family: Erebidae
- Subfamily: Arctiinae
- Genus: Ordishia
- Species: O. rutilus

Binomial name
- Ordishia rutilus (Stoll, [1781])

Synonyms
- Sphinx rutilus Stoll, [1781]; Ischnognatha striata Druce, 1895

= Ordishia rutilus =

Species of moth

Ordishia rutilus is a moth of the family Erebidae first described by Stoll in 1781. It is found in Costa Rica, Panama and Suriname.
