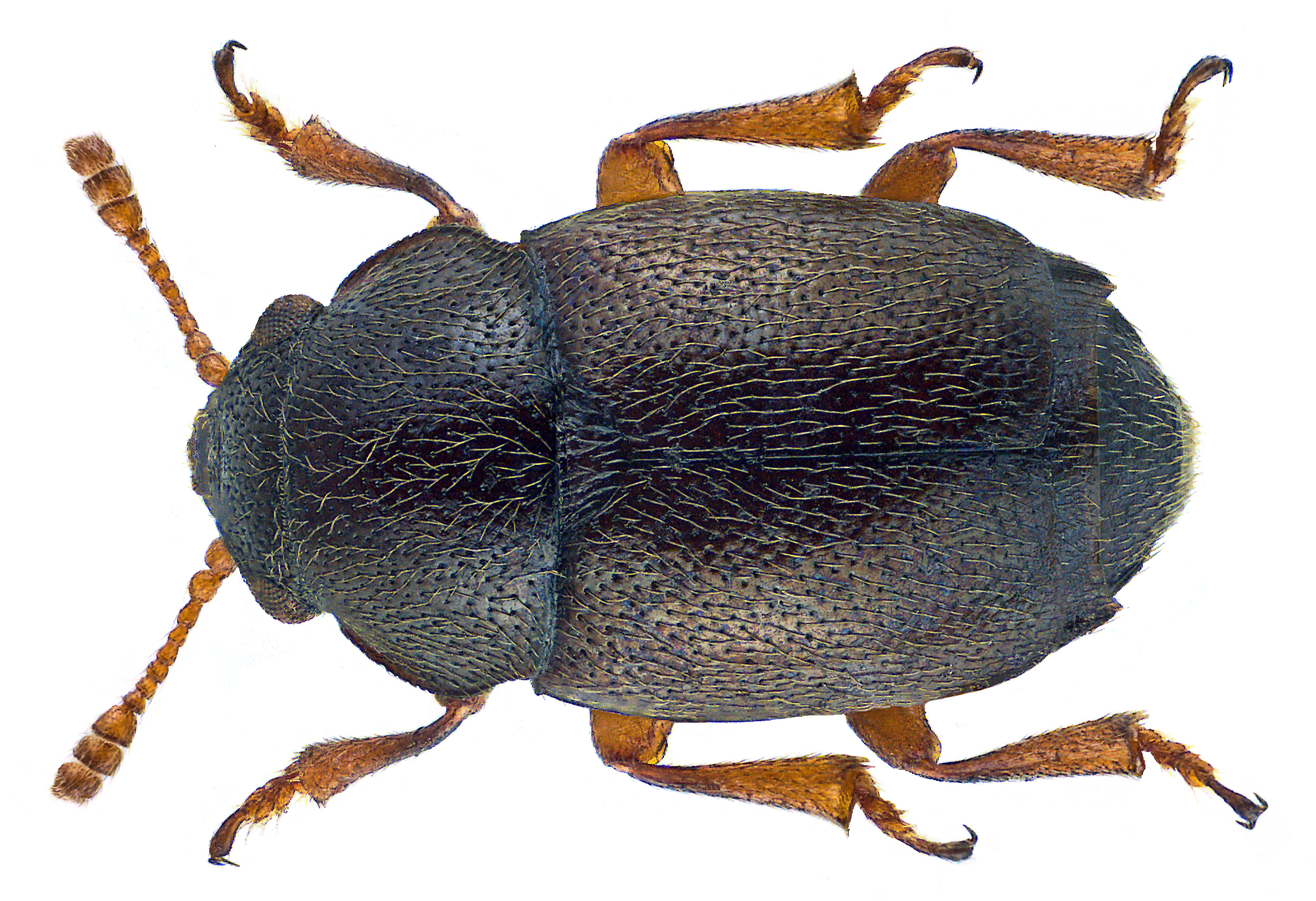
- Brachypterus urticae 1.9 mm (1.5 to 2.3 mm)

Scientific classification
- Kingdom: Animalia
- Phylum: Arthropoda
- Class: Insecta
- Order: Coleoptera
- Suborder: Polyphaga
- Infraorder: Cucujiformia
- Family: Kateretidae
- Genus: Brachypterus
- Species: B. urticae

Binomial name
- Brachypterus urticae (Fabricius, 1792)

= Brachypterus urticae =

Species of beetle

Brachypterus urticae is a species of short-winged flower beetles native to Europe.
