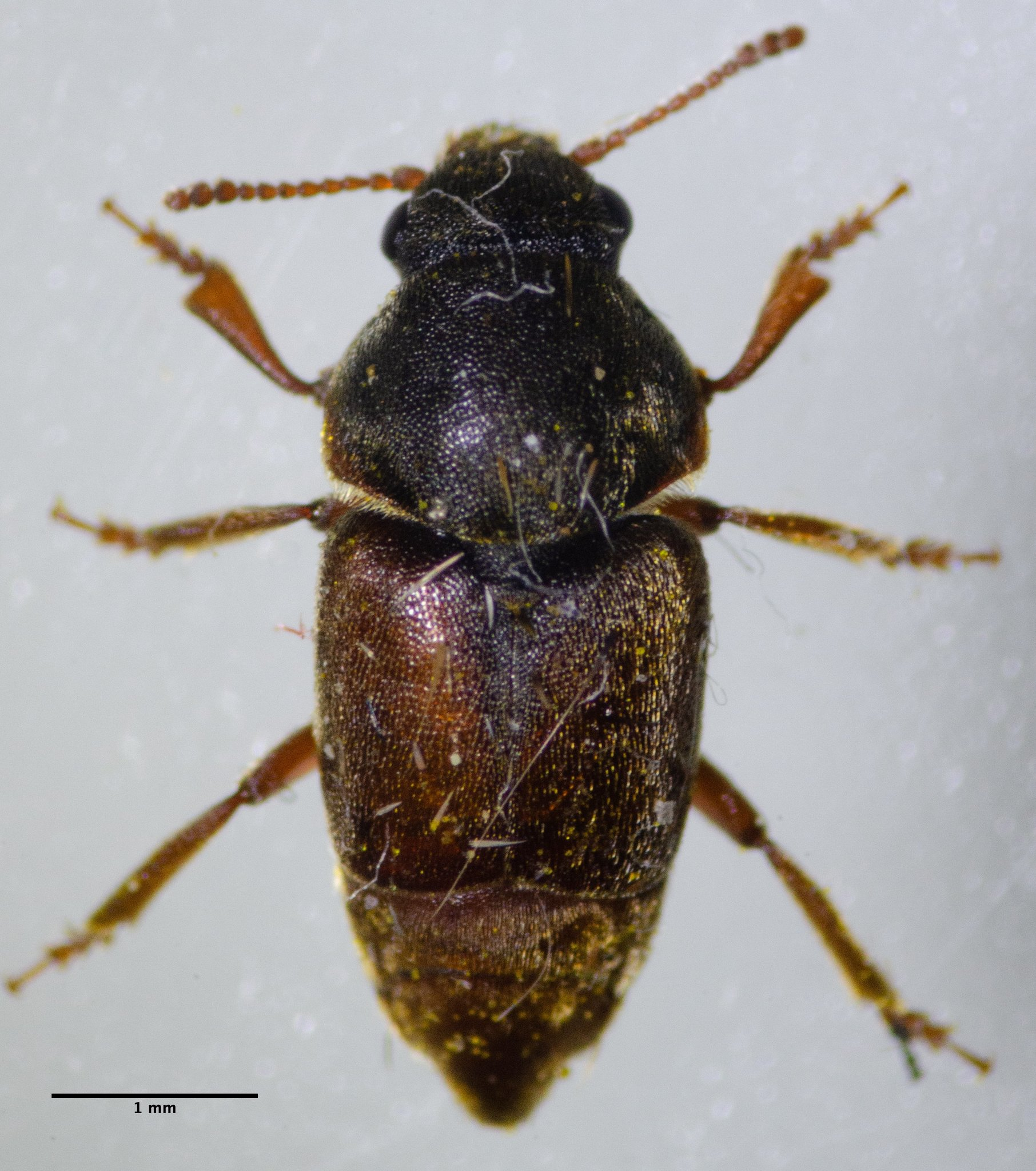

Scientific classification
- Domain: Eukaryota
- Kingdom: Animalia
- Phylum: Arthropoda
- Class: Insecta
- Order: Coleoptera
- Suborder: Polyphaga
- Infraorder: Cucujiformia
- Family: Kateretidae
- Genus: Amartus
- Species: A. tinctus

Binomial name
- Amartus tinctus (Mannerheim, 1843)

= Amartus tinctus =

Species of beetle

Amartus tinctus is a species of short-winged flower beetle in the family Kateretidae. It is found in Central America and North America.
