= Brachypterus schaefferi =

Scientific classification
- Domain: Eukaryota
- Kingdom: Animalia
- Phylum: Arthropoda
- Class: Insecta
- Order: Coleoptera
- Suborder: Polyphaga
- Infraorder: Cucujiformia
- Family: Kateretidae
- Genus: Brachypterus
- Species: B. schaefferi

Binomial name
- Brachypterus schaefferi Grouvelle, 1912

Species of beetle

Brachypterus schaefferi is a species of short-winged flower beetle in the family Kateretidae. It is found in North America.
