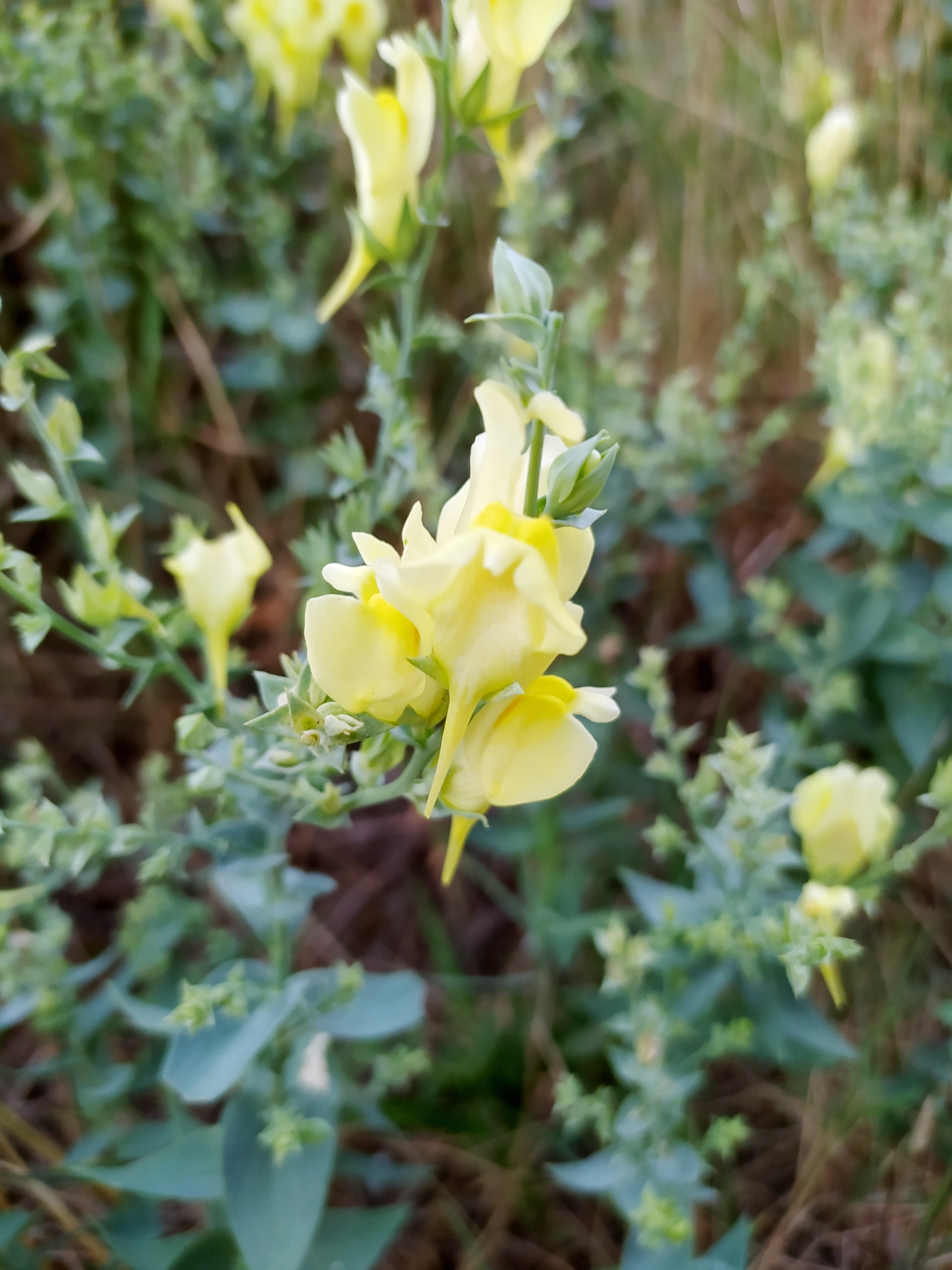
- Balkan toadflax in Brela, Croatia

Scientific classification
- Kingdom: Plantae
- Clade: Embryophytes
- Clade: Tracheophytes
- Clade: Spermatophytes
- Clade: Angiosperms
- Clade: Eudicots
- Clade: Asterids
- Order: Lamiales
- Family: Plantaginaceae
- Genus: Linaria
- Species: L. dalmatica

Binomial name
- Linaria dalmatica (L.) Mill.

Synonyms
- Antirrhinum dalmaticum L.; Linaria genistifolia subsp. dalmatica (L.) Maire & Petitm.

= Linaria dalmatica =

Species of flowering plant

Linaria dalmatica is a herbaceous, short-lived perennial plant in the family Plantaginaceae native to western Asia and southeastern Europe. As with related species, it was formerly included in the family Scrophulariaceae (figwort) family. Its common names include Balkan toadflax, broadleaf toadflax, and Dalmatian toadflax. The distribution of L. dalmatica to North America can be attributed to use as a fabric dye, folk remedies and as an ornamental plant. However, it is now classified as a weed in both Canada and the U.S.

== Taxonomy ==
Linaria dalmatica was initially named Antirrhinum dalmaticum by Carl Linnaeus in 1753 and placed with the snapdragons in Antirrhinum. The botanist Philip Miller moved it to the genus Linaria in 1768, giving the species its accepted name. It has no accepted subspecies or botanical varieties, though several have been described that among its ten synonyms. It is closely related to Linaria genistifolia, with which it may be conspecific.

Table of Synonyms
Name	Year	Rank	Notes
Antirrhinum dalmaticum L.	1753	species	≡ hom.
Linaria dalmatica subsp. macedonica (Griseb.) D.A.Sutton	1988	subspecies	= het.
Linaria dalmatica var. macedonica (Griseb.) Vandas	1909	variety	= het.
Linaria dalmatica subsp. tessala Formánek	1895	subspecies	= het.
Linaria dalmatica var. tessala (Formánek) Delip. & M.Popova	1995	variety	= het.
Linaria genistifolia subsp. dalmatica (L.) Maire & Petitm.	1908	subspecies	≡ hom.
Linaria macedonica Griseb.	1844	species	= het.
Linaria pancicii Janka ex Nyman	1890	species	= het., not validly publ.
Linaria smithii Boiss. & Orph.	1879	species	= het.
Linaria zangezura Grossh.	1929	species	= het.
Notes: ≡ homotypic synonym; = heterotypic synonym

=== Etymology ===
The genus name Linaria, appears to stem from the Latin word linum, meaning flax, as some species have leaves that appear flax-like. The species name dalmatica refers to the region of Dalmatia on the Balkan Peninsula.

== Description ==
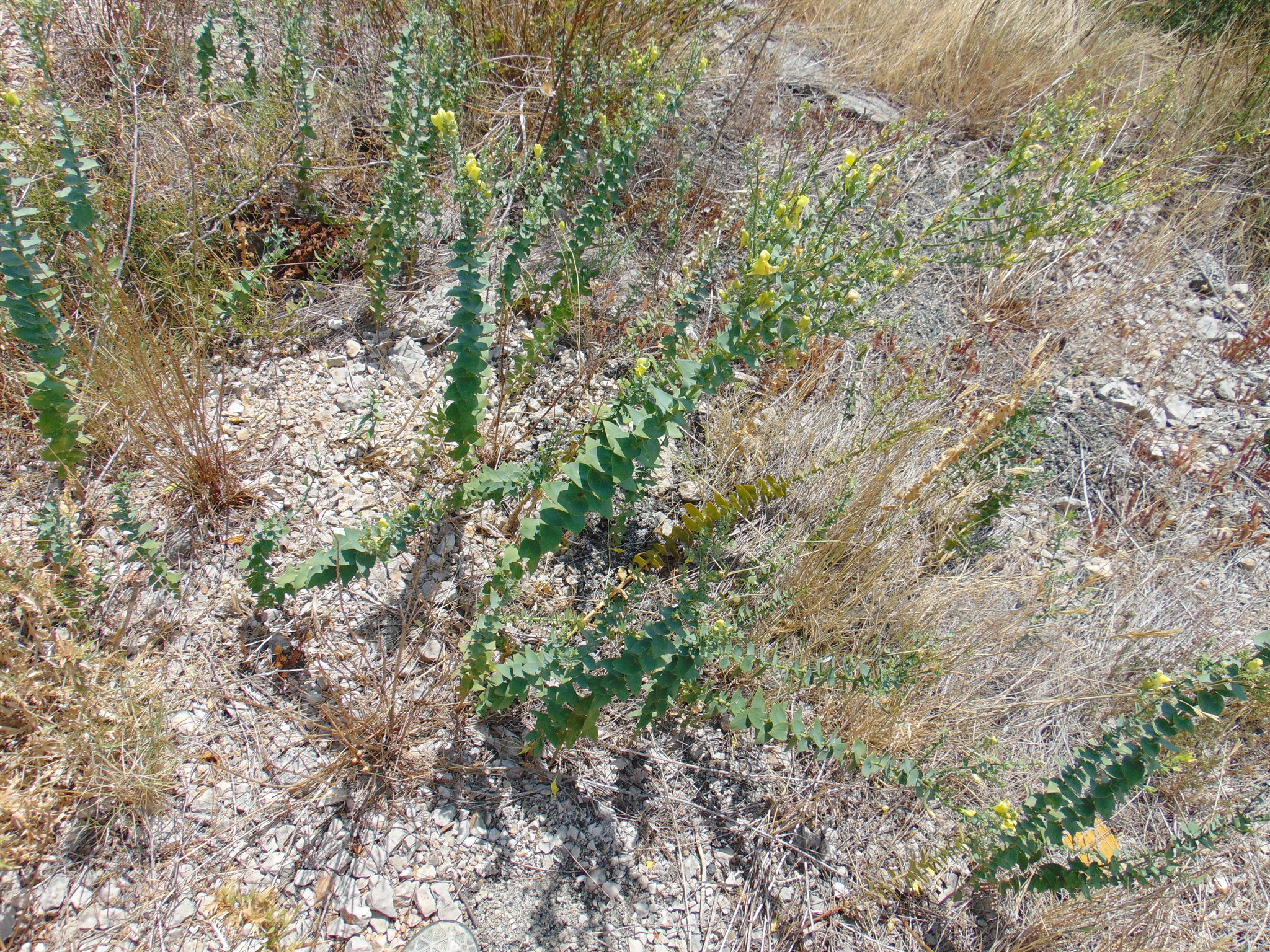
Balkan toadflax in Brela, Croatia

=== Leaves ===
Leaves are broad and heart-shaped and are arranged in an alternating pattern. The leaves are attached to the stem ascending outward and are smooth, waxy and glabrous. In addition, they do not have petioles.

=== Flowers ===
Flowers are raceme and are composed of five sepals and five petals, four pairs of stamens of unequal length and pistils are bicarpellate. Flowering of L. dalmatica takes place from late May to September. The flowers are bilaterally symmetrical and have spurs pointing downwards.

=== Seeds ===
Seed production of L. dalmatica is dependent on many factors such as environmental conditions and competition sites. In sites with favourable conditions (moisture availability) and low competition of other plants, up to 500,000 seeds can be produced per plant. Seeds are small and appears black to purplish-brown in colour. Seed dispersal can be through a number of ways including wind, wildlife and seed ingestion by animals. Seeds tend to germinate in the spring, however they can also germinate in the fall. The weight and development of seeds are influenced by the environment in which they grow, where growth is significantly impacted by moisture availability. With low moisture availability or drought conditions, growth may be inhibited as Linaria dalmatica are weak competitors in these conditions. Development of seeds are typically slow to begin with but increase with time.

=== Roots ===
L. dalmatica has an extensive root system. The roots of L. dalmatica make it a strong competitor as they can produce long and deep taproots that are able to obtain take control of resources required for growth such as moisture and nutrients. In addition, lateral roots also arise from the buds present on the roots that contribute to the plants ability to obtain resources. These lateral roots can grow up to 3 m (10 ft) away from the parent plant. The roots are a great storage place for energy and they possess the greatest amount of energy storage in the fall, storing sugars (i.e. fructose and glucose). Contrastingly, the least amount of energy stored in the roots occur in June just as the flowers are set to bloom.

L. dalmatica also produces creeping roots which appear white in colour. These roots allow for a rapid rate of reproduction of these plants.

== Habitat ==
=== Invasive species ===
Linaria dalmatica is listed as a noxious weed in fourteen U.S. states and three provinces in Canada. However, it is present in thirty-one U.S. states and ten provinces and two territories in Canada. It is a grassland invader native to the Mediterranean region, and it was introduced to North America in the late 1800s. It has fast-growing strong, horizontal roots, and can withstand cold, and is a problem for farms and grasslands in the interior of British Columbia.

L. dalmatica has adapted to a wide range of conditions and can commonly be found in growing on roadsides, valleys, gravel pits, fields, pastures and overgrazed or deteriorated rangelands to name a few. They tend to thrive in open areas that are not well-kept and disturbed soils.

==== Control and management ====
As L. dalmatica are regarded as a noxious weed, determining solutions to manage and control the growth is essential. Due the high adaptability of L. dalmatica, they are able to outcompete plants and thus remain present and use all the resources required for growth. It is critical to remove these plants at their most vulnerable stage which is when it is at its seed stage. Hence methods to remove L. dalmatica are essential to prevent seed formation preceding flowering.

===== Chemical control =====
The use of herbicides are effective to remove weeds, however, when used on L. dalmatica results of this chemical control vary. Herbicide control of L. dalmatica seems to be short-term as the leaves waxy surface help prevent herbicide uptake and its potency. Furthermore, its extensive root system aids in reproduction when herbicides manage to remove the flowering plant. It is recommended herbicide use is the most effective pre-bloom or in the death stages of L. dalmatica. Herbicide use as these stages can promote long-term control and have a greater impact on the removal of these plants as energy storage in the roots are at its least.

===== Mechanical control =====
Removing L. dalmatica by digging up the roots by hand and with a shovel is effective but requires many years to suppress and remove all L. dalmatica plants.

===== Biological control =====
The release of insects feeding on the leaves and stems of L. dalmatica is an additional way to control the rapid reproduction of this plant. The most prominent insect that aids in the suppression of L. dalmatica growth is the toadflax stem-mining weevil. The toadflax stem weevil has been vital in the disruption of nutrient and water transport as larvae laid by the toadflax stem weevil feed on the stem while the developed adults feed on the leaves. The disruption of the resources used for growth inhibits the bloom of some flowers and therefore reduces the production of seeds. Additionally, shoot growth is inhibited as they wither before they reach growth due to insufficient nutrients and water.

Additional insects that feed on the L. dalmatica and used as a biological control are the Brachypterolus pulicarius, Gymnaetron antirrhini and Rhinusa neta and Mecinus janthinus.

===== Cultural control =====
The use of cultural control alone is not effective but in combination with other controls such as chemical promote greater success in controlling L. dalmatica. The methods of burning and tilling may be effective alongside the spraying of herbicides. The addition of other competitive plants to compete with L. dalmatica can also promote the removal of this noxious weed. Control through cultivation must be persistent and engaged in for at least two years to improve effectiveness of removal.

== Toxicity ==
Regarding the toxicity level of L. dalmatica, there is a lack of information to determine if it is toxic or not to both animals and humans. For animals, exposure and consumption of this plant is observed to be relatively low as it is not their preferred forage although grazing does occur. It is likely that, after initial consumption of the plant ruminants experience uncomfortable symptoms and avoid grazing on it.

No data existed as of 2011 on the human toxicity of toadflaxes, although it has been listed as an irritant and a hay fever trigger. It has been used in folk medicine as a sedative, and in a compound with vasicine as an expectorant in traditional Chinese medicine. These vasicine compounds can provoke miscarriage.
