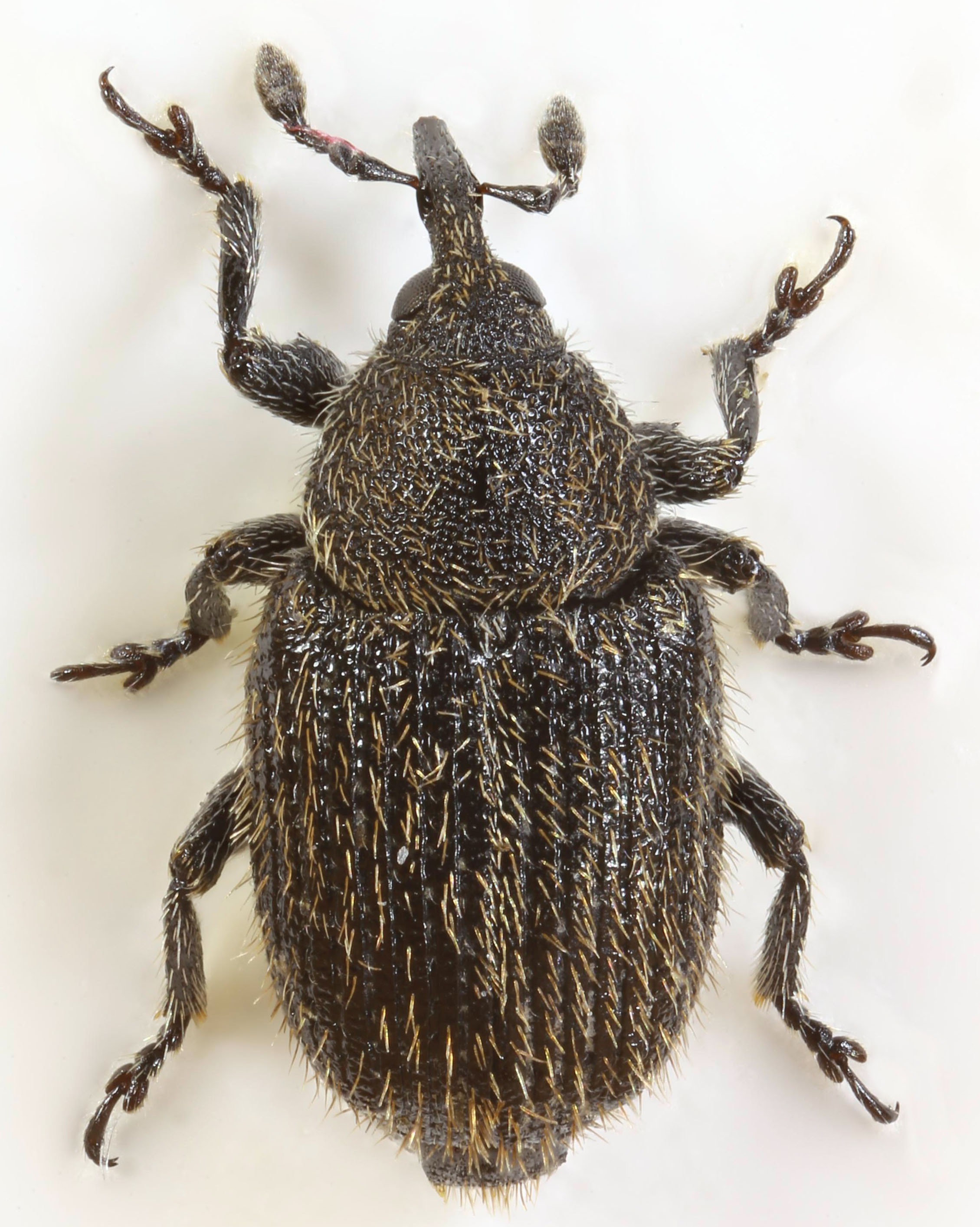

Scientific classification
- Kingdom: Animalia
- Phylum: Arthropoda
- Class: Insecta
- Order: Coleoptera
- Suborder: Polyphaga
- Infraorder: Cucujiformia
- Family: Curculionidae
- Genus: Rhinusa
- Species: R. antirrhini

Binomial name
- Rhinusa antirrhini Paykull, 1800

= Rhinusa antirrhini =

Species of beetle

Rhinusa antirrhini, known generally as toadflax seedhead weevil, is a species of true weevil in the family of beetles known as Curculionidae. Other common names include the toadflax capsule weevil and seed-gall weevil.

== As a biological control agent ==
Rhinusa antirrhini feeds on two species of toadflax, Dalmatian toadflax (Linaria dalmatica) and Yellow toadflax (Linaria vulgaris). Both of these host species are native to Europe, and are considered invasive in North America. Rhinusa antirrhini was accidentally introduced to North America in the early 1900s, and several populations were intentionally relocated within North America or imported from Europe in the 1990s to combat invasive Linaria growth. Rhinusa antirrhini is well adapted for the North American climate and has become well established, though it is not considered an effective biological control agent of Linaria species.

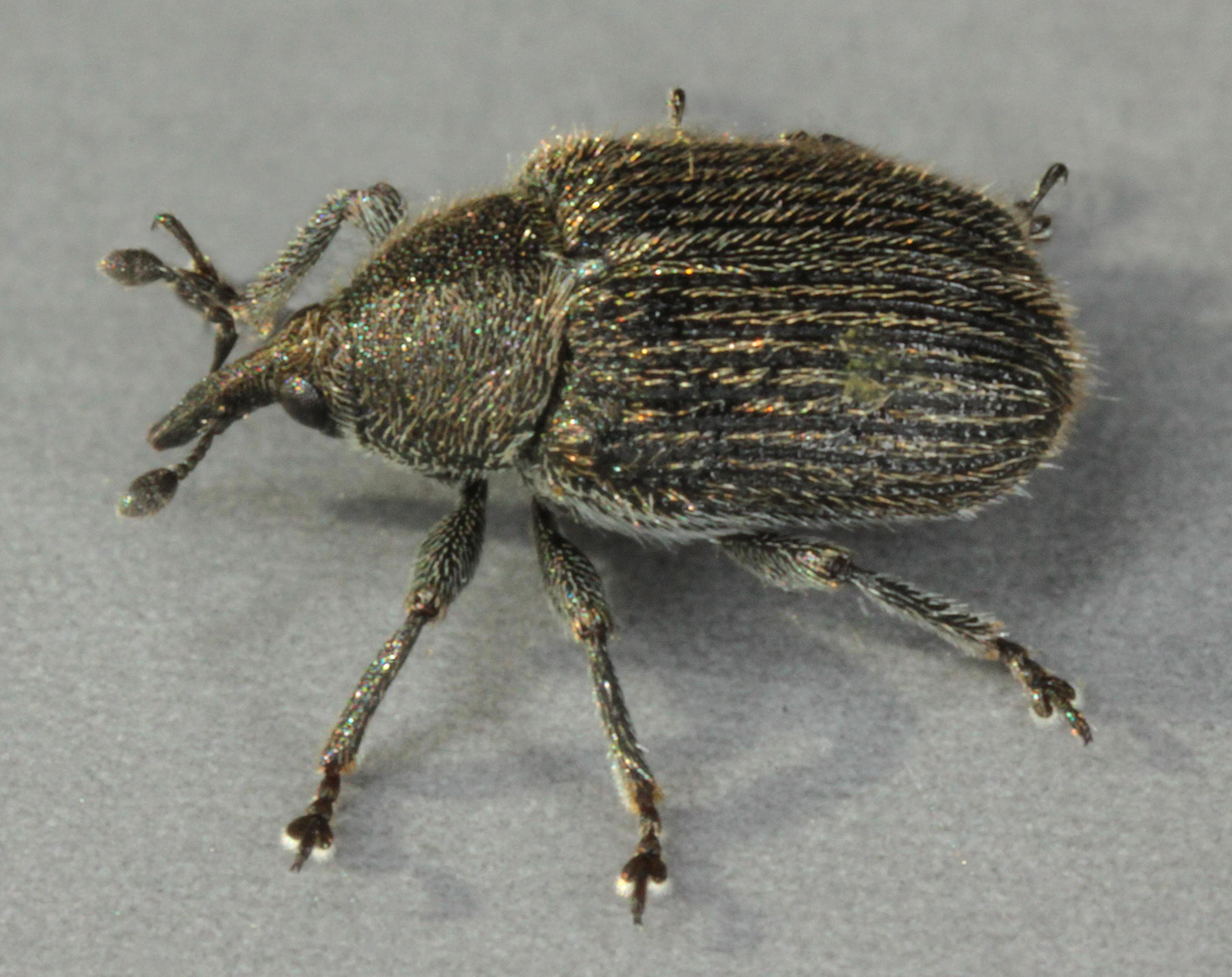
Toadflax seedhead weevil, Rhinusa antirrhini

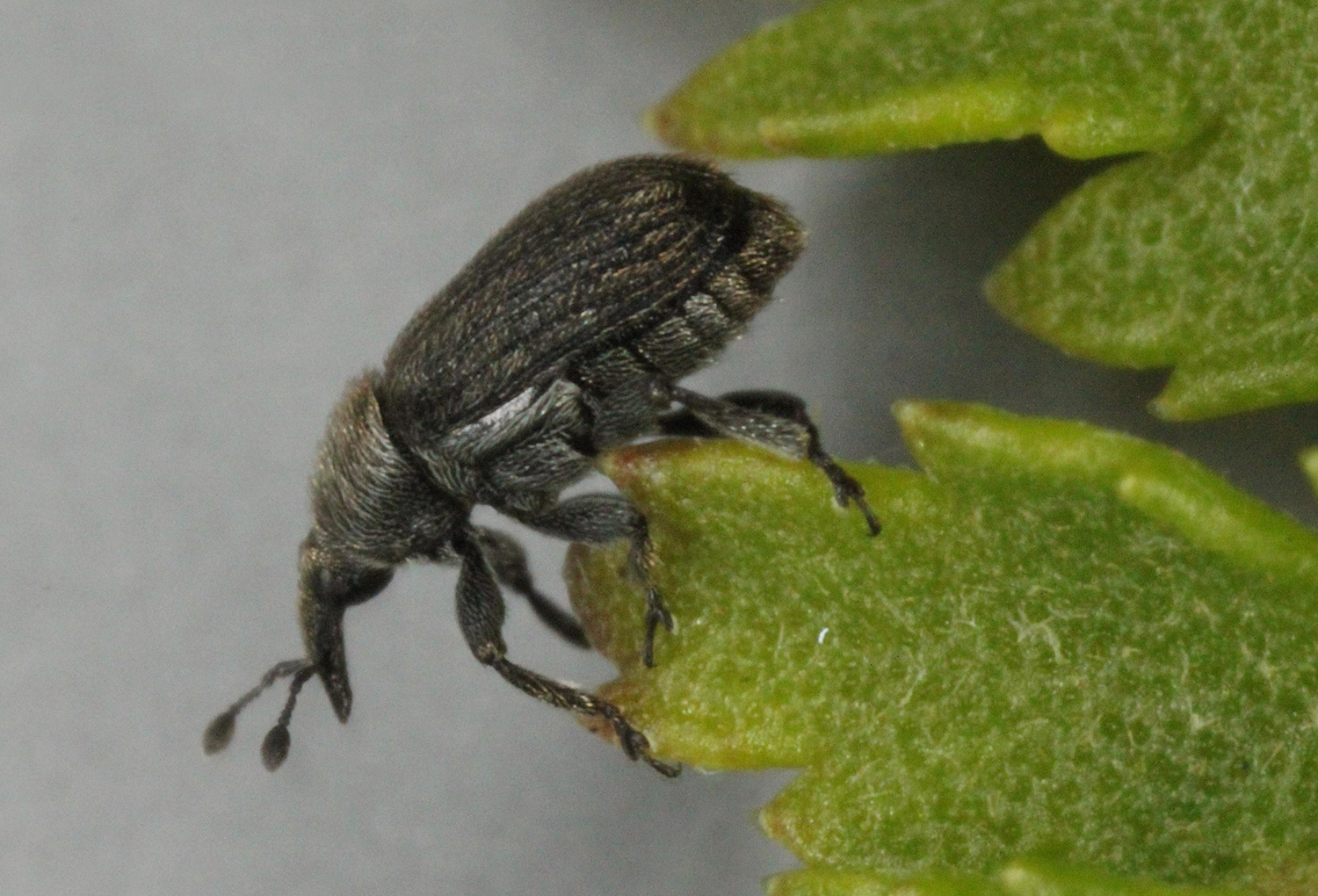
Toadflax seedhead weevil, Rhinusa antirrhini
