= Heterhelus sericans =

Scientific classification
- Domain: Eukaryota
- Kingdom: Animalia
- Phylum: Arthropoda
- Class: Insecta
- Order: Coleoptera
- Suborder: Polyphaga
- Infraorder: Cucujiformia
- Family: Kateretidae
- Genus: Heterhelus
- Species: H. sericans

Binomial name
- Heterhelus sericans (LeConte, 1869)

Species of beetle

Heterhelus sericans is a species of short-winged flower beetle in the family Kateretidae. It is found in North America.

== Subspecies ==
These two subspecies belong to the species Heterhelus sericans:

- Heterhelus sericans pennatus (Murray, 1864)
- Heterhelus sericans sericans (LeConte, 1859)
