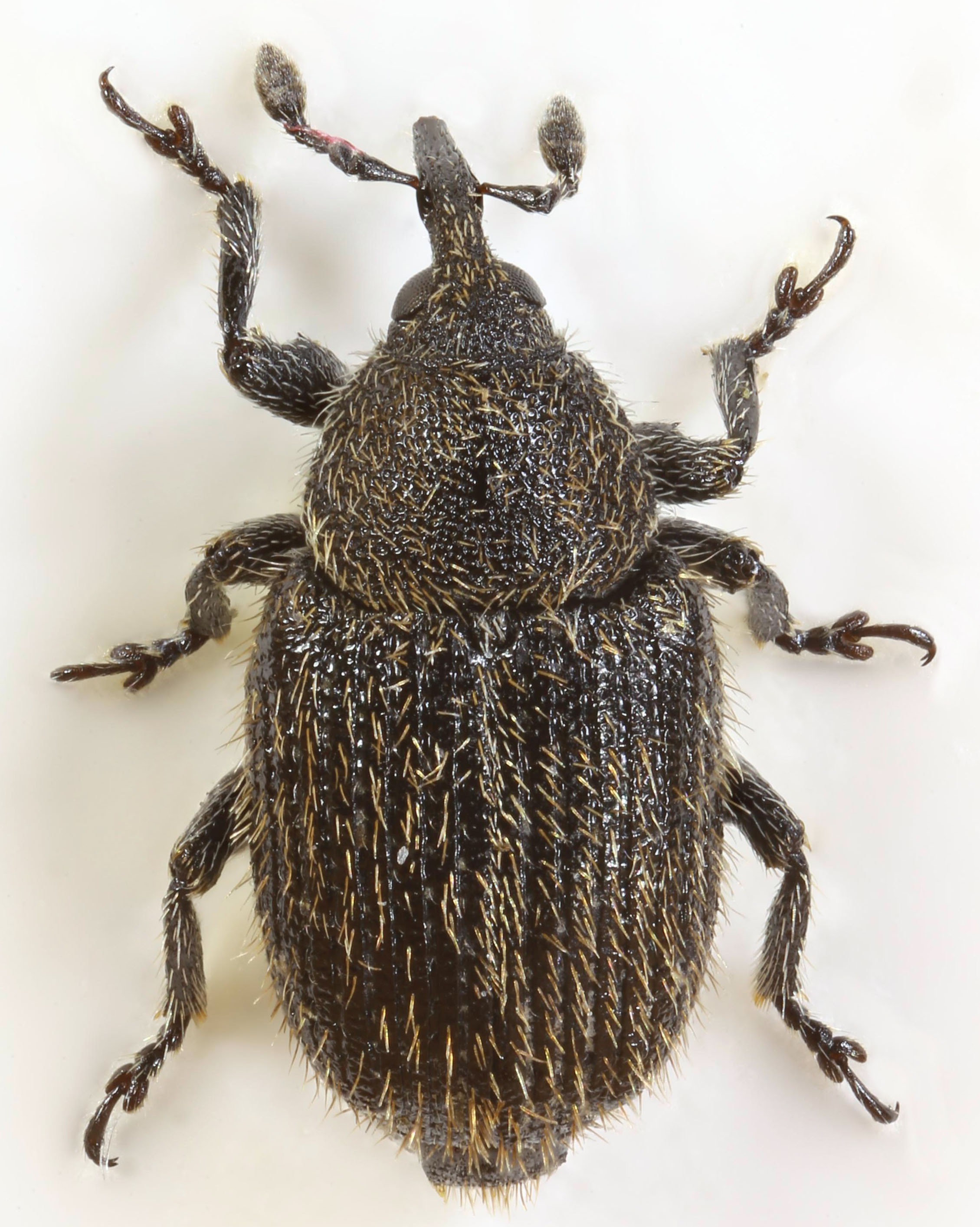
- Rhinusa antirrhini

Scientific classification
- Domain: Eukaryota
- Kingdom: Animalia
- Phylum: Arthropoda
- Class: Insecta
- Order: Coleoptera
- Suborder: Polyphaga
- Infraorder: Cucujiformia
- Family: Curculionidae
- Tribe: Mecinini
- Genus: Rhinusa; Stephens, 1829

= Rhinusa =

Genus of beetles

Rhinusa is a genus of true weevils in the family of beetles known as Curculionidae. There are at least 20 described species in Rhinusa.

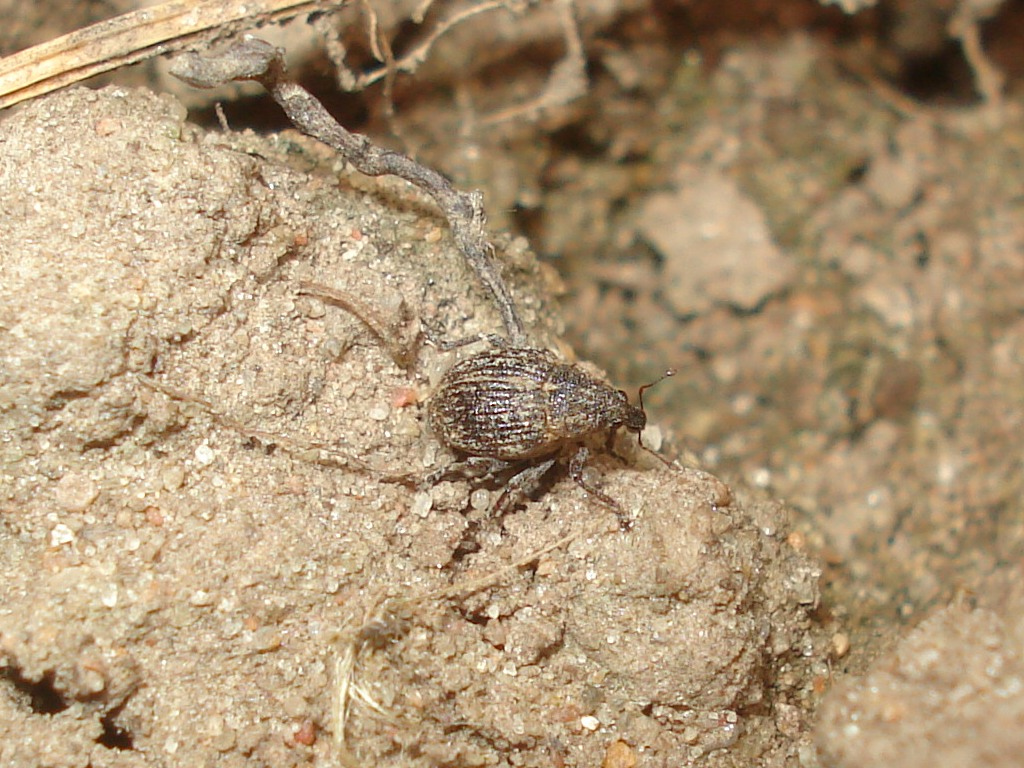
Rhinusa tetra

== Species ==
These 23 species belong to the genus Rhinusa:

- Rhinusa acephalus Stephens, 1829^{c}
- Rhinusa acifer Caldara, 2014^{c g}
- Rhinusa algiricum Caldara, 2001^{c}
- Rhinusa antirhini Stephens, 1829^{c}
- Rhinusa antirrhini Schoenherr, 1825^{c g b} (toadflax seedhead weevil)
- Rhinusa bipustulata (Rossi, P., 1792)^{c g}
- Rhinusa brevipilis (Desbrochers, 1893)^{g}
- Rhinusa collina Gistel, 1848^{c}
- Rhinusa comosa Rosenschoeld, 1838^{g}
- Rhinusa ensifer Caldara, 2014^{c g}
- Rhinusa exigua Caldara & Korotyaev, 2010^{c}
- Rhinusa fuentei Pic, 1906^{g}
- Rhinusa intaminata Stephens, 1829^{c}
- Rhinusa linariae (Panzer, 1792)^{c g b} (root-gall weevil)
- Rhinusa mauritii Caldara, 2001^{c}
- Rhinusa neta (Germar, 1821)^{b}
- Rhinusa pelletieri Caldara, 2014^{c g}
- Rhinusa scrophulariae Caldara in Magnano, Colonneli & Caldara in van Harten (ed.), 2009^{c}
- Rhinusa smreczynskii (Fremuth, 1972)^{g}
- Rhinusa tetra (Fabricius, 1792)^{c g b} (European curculionid weevil)
- Rhinusa tricolor Stephens, 1829^{c}
- Rhinusa verbasci Rosenschoeld, 1838^{g}
- Rhinusa weilli Caldara, 2014^{c g}

Data sources: i = ITIS, c = Catalogue of Life, g = GBIF, b = Bugguide.net
