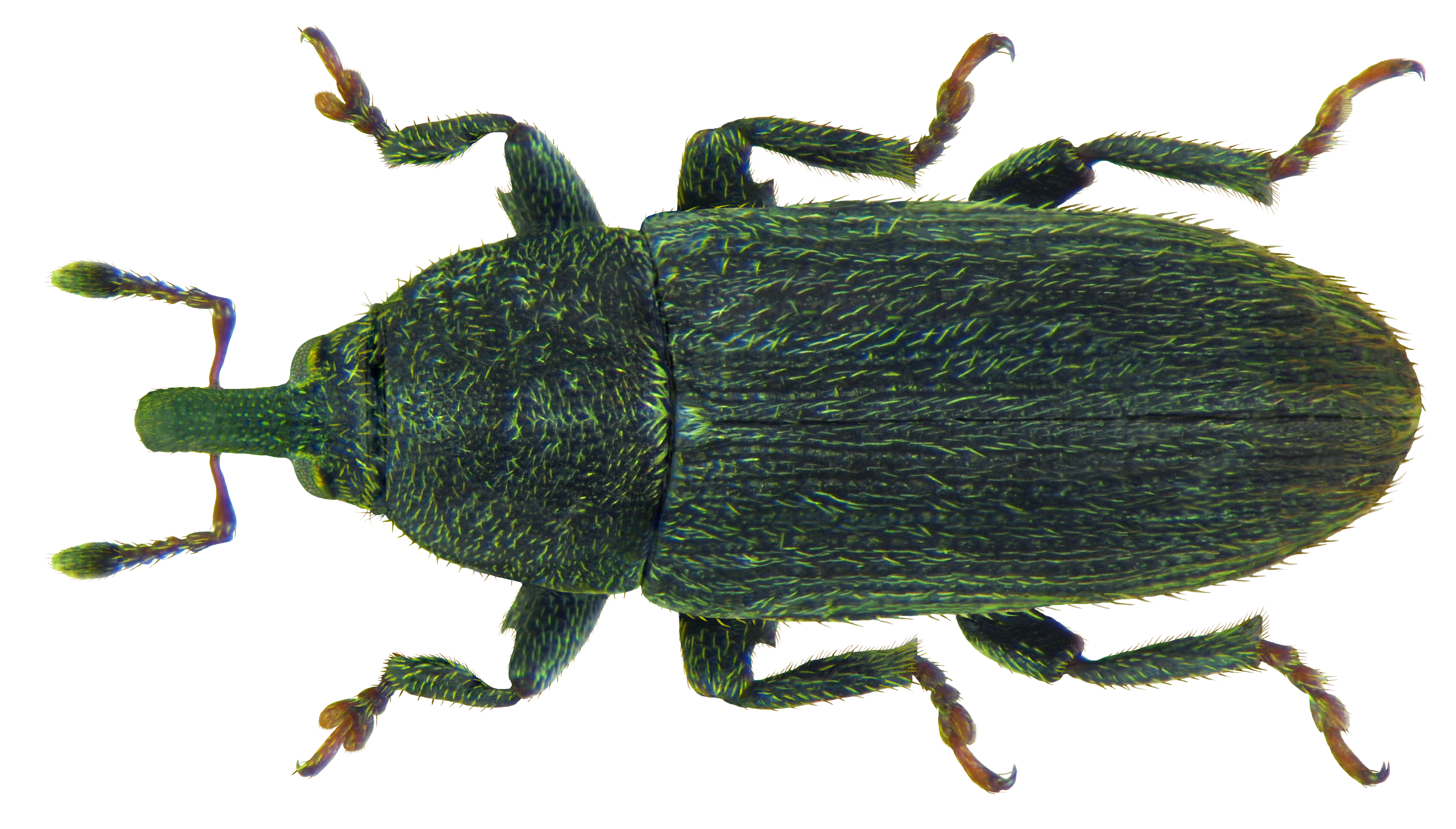
- Mecinus pyraster 3,6 mm (2,8-4 mm)

Scientific classification
- Kingdom: Animalia
- Phylum: Arthropoda
- Class: Insecta
- Order: Coleoptera
- Suborder: Polyphaga
- Infraorder: Cucujiformia
- Family: Curculionidae
- Genus: Mecinus
- Species: M. pyraster

Binomial name
- Mecinus pyraster (Herbst, 1795)

= Mecinus pyraster =

Species of beetle

Mecinus pyraster is a species of weevil native to Europe.
