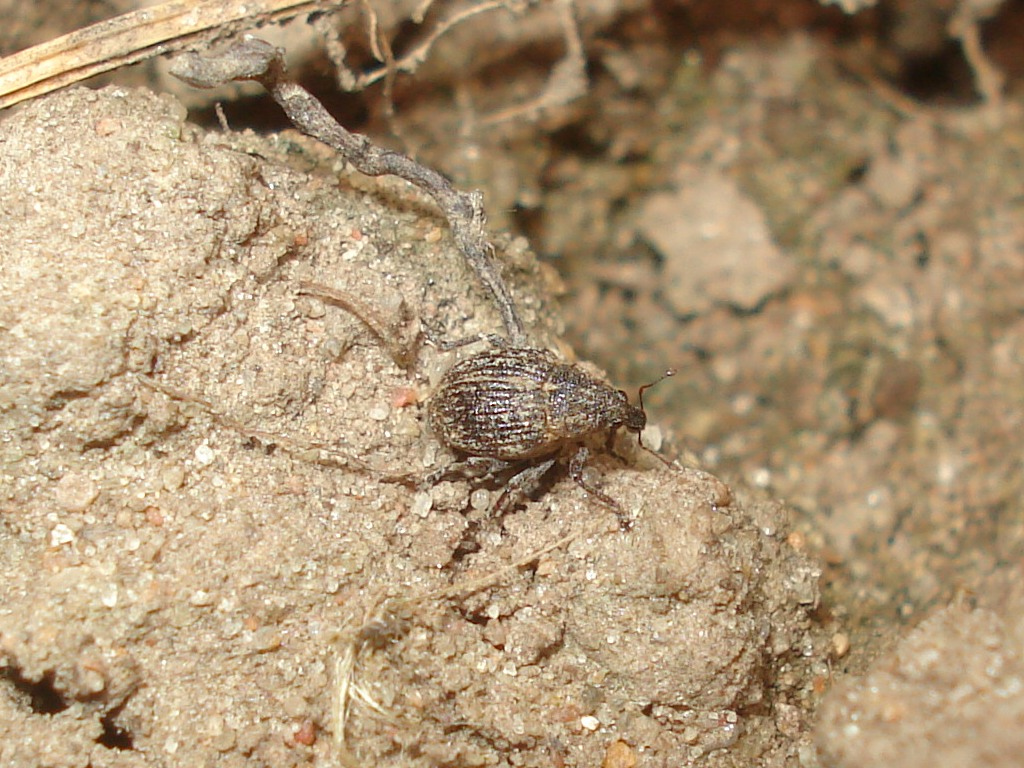

Scientific classification
- Kingdom: Animalia
- Phylum: Arthropoda
- Clade: Pancrustacea
- Class: Insecta
- Order: Coleoptera
- Suborder: Polyphaga
- Infraorder: Cucujiformia
- Superfamily: Curculionoidea
- Family: Curculionidae
- Genus: Rhinusa
- Species: R. tetra

Binomial name
- Rhinusa tetra (Fabricius, 1792)

= Rhinusa tetra =

Species of beetle

Rhinusa tetra, known generally as the European curculionid weevil or mullein weevil, is a species of true weevil in the family of beetles known as Curculionidae.
