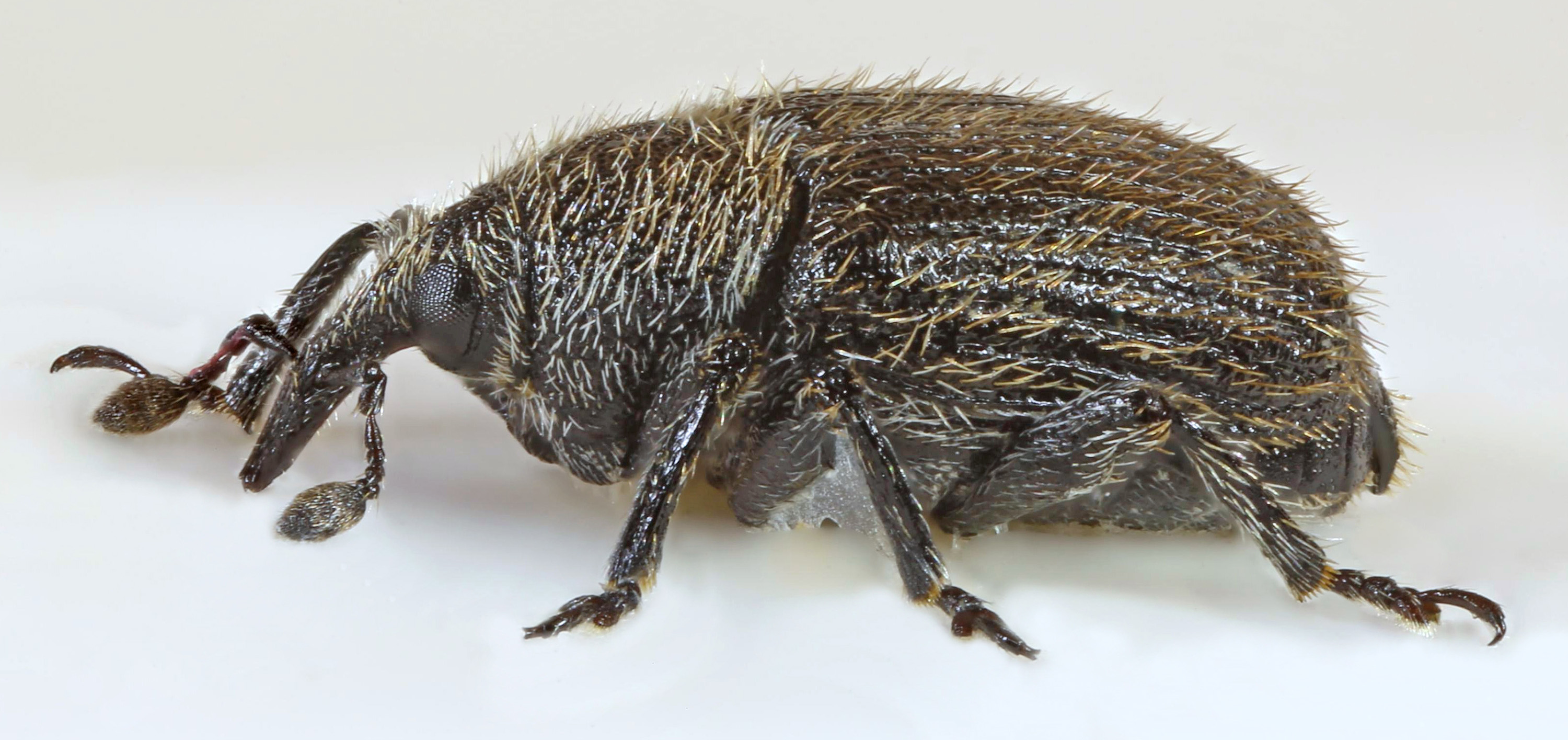
- Gymnetron antirrhini, Dovey Junction, North Wales

Scientific classification
- Domain: Eukaryota
- Kingdom: Animalia
- Phylum: Arthropoda
- Class: Insecta
- Order: Coleoptera
- Suborder: Polyphaga
- Infraorder: Cucujiformia
- Family: Curculionidae
- Tribe: Mecinini
- Genus: Gymnetron; Schönherr, 1825

= Gymnetron =

Genus of beetles

Gymnetron is a genus of beetles belonging to the family Curculionidae.

The species of this genus are found in Eurasia, Africa and Northern America.

Species:

- Gymnetron aenigma Caldara, 2003
- Gymnetron aequale Reitter, 1907
