= Anthonaeus =

Scientific classification
- Domain: Eukaryota
- Kingdom: Animalia
- Phylum: Arthropoda
- Class: Insecta
- Order: Coleoptera
- Suborder: Polyphaga
- Infraorder: Cucujiformia
- Family: Kateretidae
- Genus: Anthonaeus; Horn, 1879

Genus of beetles

Anthonaeus is a genus of short-winged flower beetles in the family Kateretidae. There is one described species in Anthonaeus, A. agavensis.
