= Cleopomiarus =

Scientific classification
- Domain: Eukaryota
- Kingdom: Animalia
- Phylum: Arthropoda
- Class: Insecta
- Order: Coleoptera
- Suborder: Polyphaga
- Infraorder: Cucujiformia
- Family: Curculionidae
- Subfamily: Curculioninae
- Tribe: Mecinini
- Genus: Cleopomiarus; Pierce, 1919

Genus of beetles

Cleopomiarus is a genus of beetles belonging to the family Curculionidae.

The genus was first described by Pierce in 1919.

The species of this genus are found in Eurasia and Southern Africa.

Species:

- Cleopomiarus distinctus
- Cleopomiarus graminis
- Cleopomiarus micros
