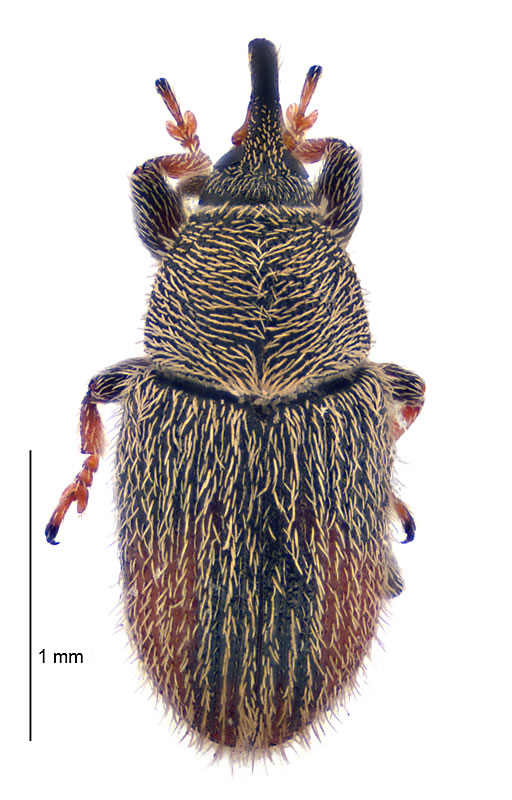

Scientific classification
- Kingdom: Animalia
- Phylum: Arthropoda
- Class: Insecta
- Order: Coleoptera
- Suborder: Polyphaga
- Infraorder: Cucujiformia
- Family: Curculionidae
- Genus: Mecinus
- Species: M. pascuorum

Binomial name
- Mecinus pascuorum (Gyllenhal, 1813)

= Mecinus pascuorum =

Species of beetle

Mecinus pascuorum is a species of true weevil in the family of beetles known as Curculionidae. It is found in North America, Europe, and New Zealand

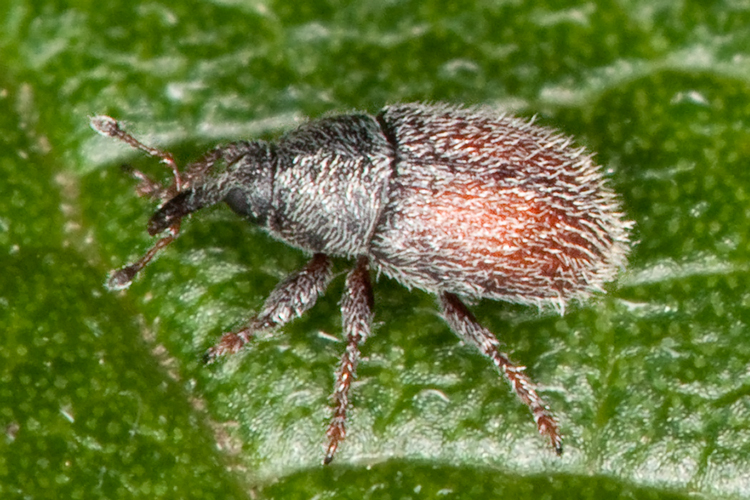

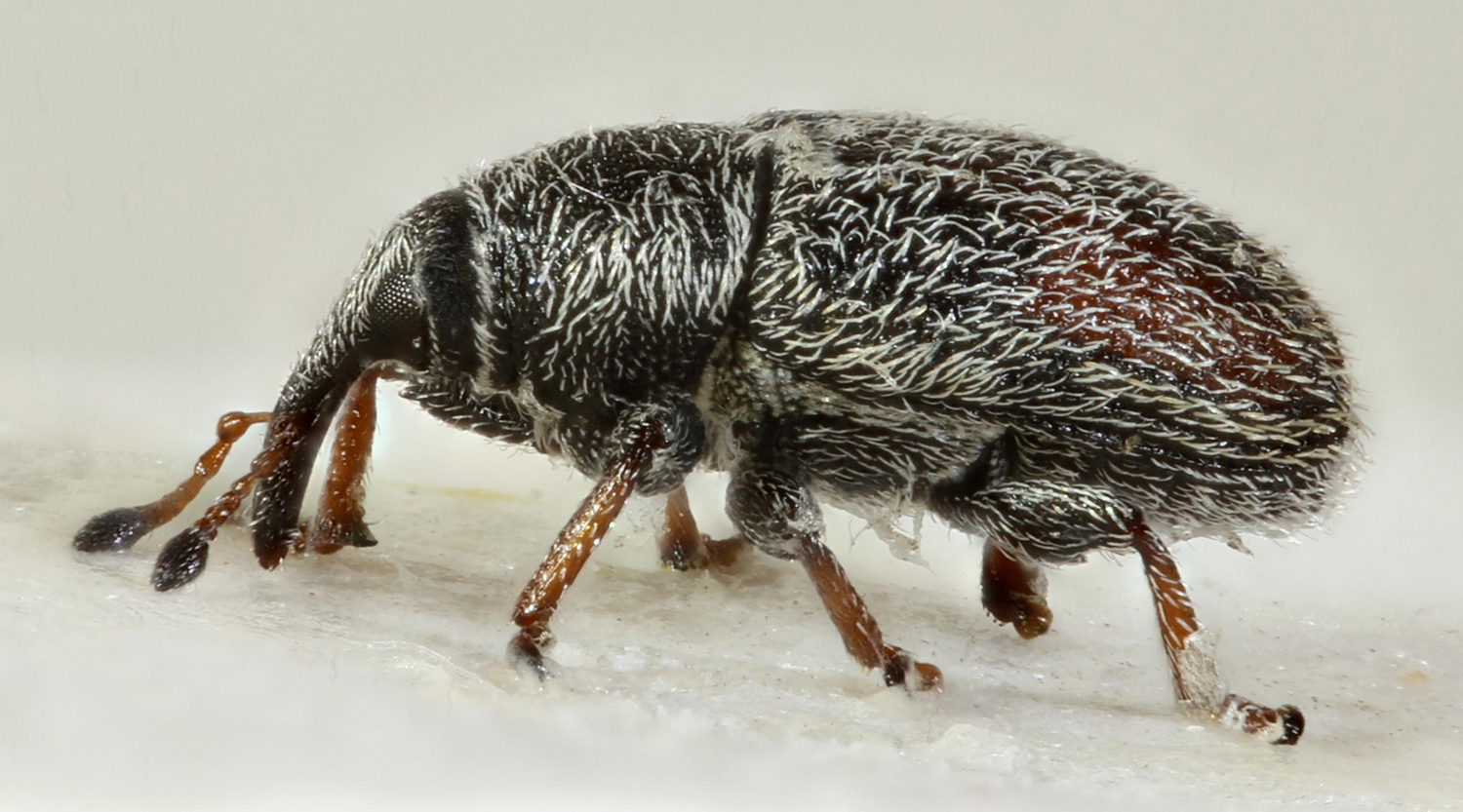
