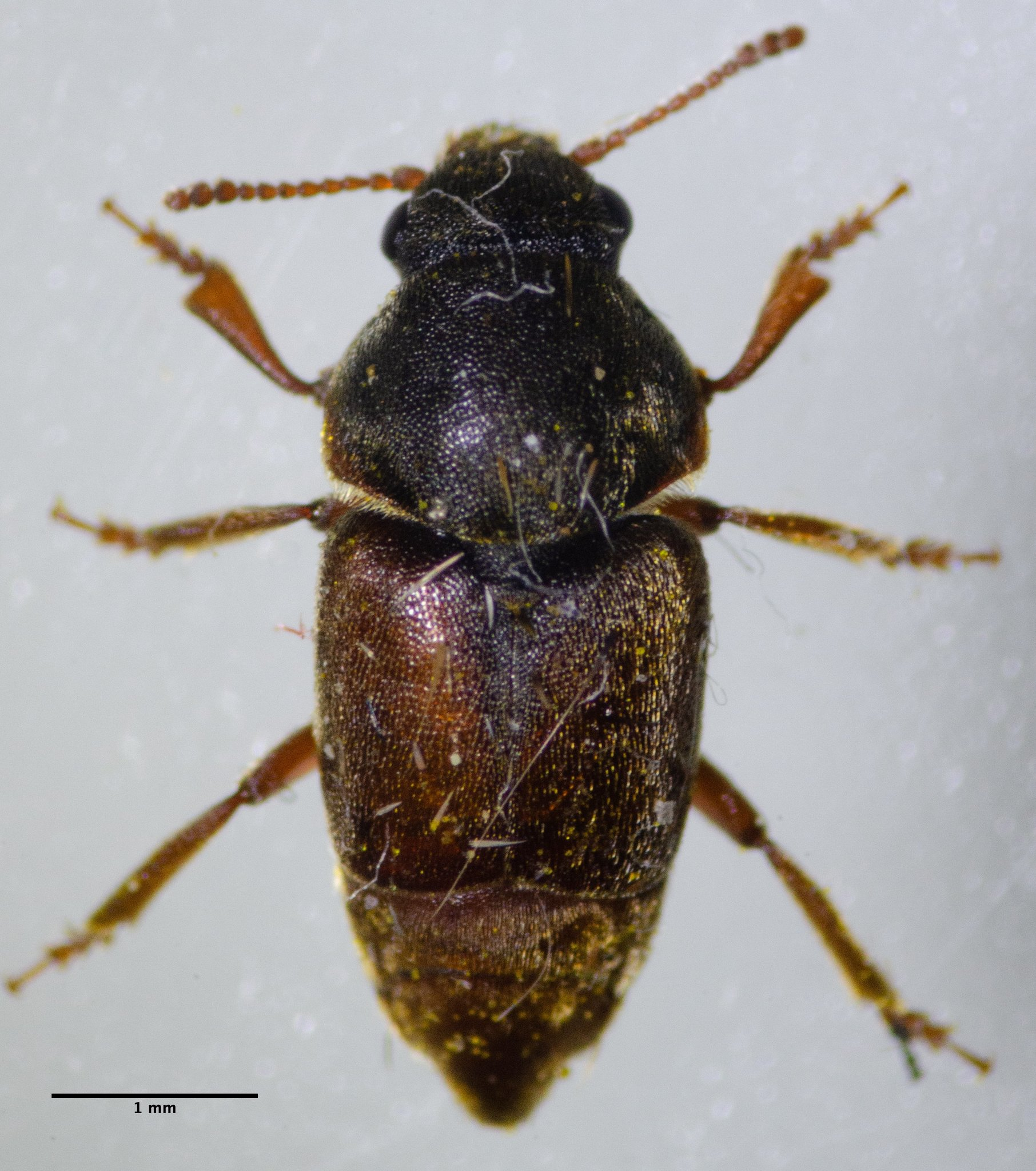

Scientific classification
- Kingdom: Animalia
- Phylum: Arthropoda
- Class: Insecta
- Order: Coleoptera
- Suborder: Polyphaga
- Infraorder: Cucujiformia
- Family: Kateretidae
- Genus: Amartus; LeConte, 1861

= Amartus =

Genus of beetles

Amartus is a genus of short-winged flower beetles in the family Kateretidae. There are at least three described species in Amartus.

== Species ==
These three species belong to the genus Amartus:

- Amartus petrefactus Wickham, 1912
- Amartus rufipes LeConte, 1861
- Amartus tinctus (Mannerheim, 1843)
