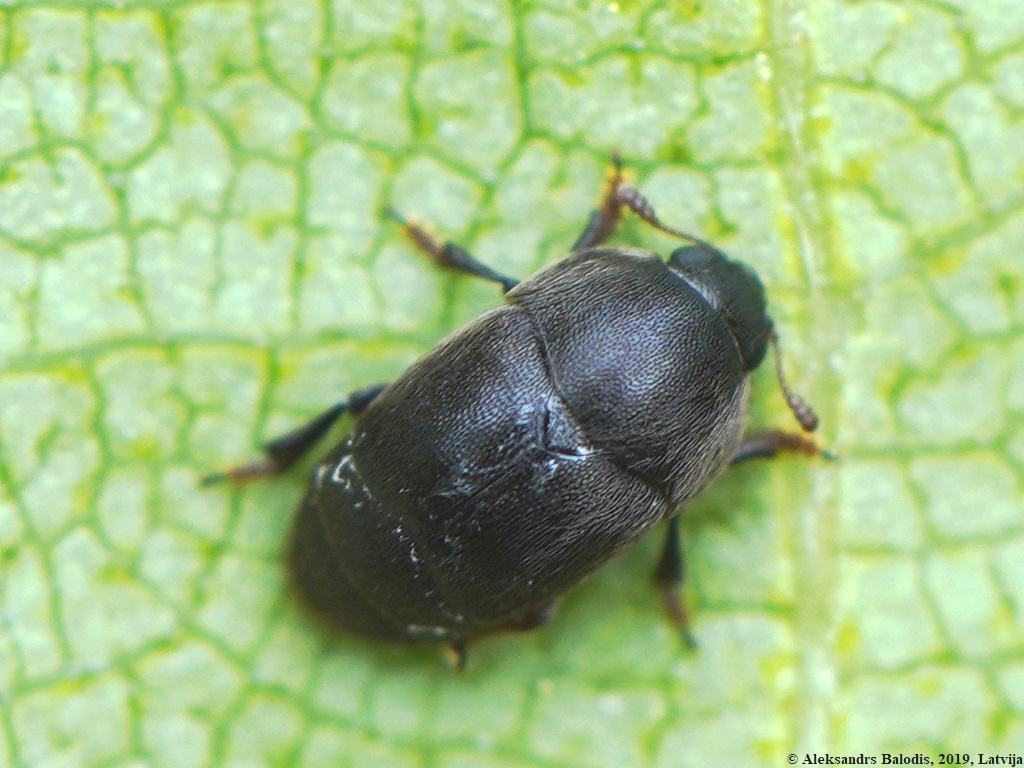

Scientific classification
- Kingdom: Animalia
- Phylum: Arthropoda
- Class: Insecta
- Order: Coleoptera
- Suborder: Polyphaga
- Infraorder: Cucujiformia
- Family: Kateretidae
- Genus: Brachypterolus
- Species: B. pulicarius

Binomial name
- Brachypterolus pulicarius (Linnaeus, 1758)

= Brachypterolus pulicarius =

Species of beetle

Brachypterolus pulicarius, known generally as the toadflax flower-eating beetle or antirrhinum beetle, is a species of short-winged flower beetle in the family Kateretidae. It is found in Europe and Northern Asia (excluding China) and North America.
