= Anamartus =

Scientific classification
- Kingdom: Animalia
- Phylum: Arthropoda
- Clade: Pancrustacea
- Class: Insecta
- Order: Coleoptera
- Suborder: Polyphaga
- Infraorder: Cucujiformia
- Family: Kateretidae
- Genus: Anamartus; Jelinek, 1976

Genus of beetles

Anamartus is a genus of beetles in the family Kateretidae. It was first described in 1976 by Jelínek. It has 9 accepted species.

== Species ==
- Anamartus appli Ganglbaur, 1900
- Anamartus aurosericeus Reitter, 1873
- Anamartus dilutitarsis Solsky, 1876
- Anamartus incognitus Jelínek, 1976
- Anamartus jelineki Audisio, 1980
- Anamartus olexai Jelínek, 1976
- Anamartus opacus Abille, 1892
- Anamartus sinuatus Jelínek, 1976
- Anamartus strobli Reitter, 1885
