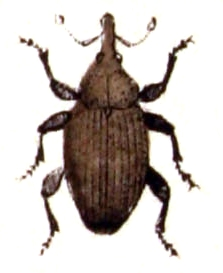

Scientific classification
- Kingdom: Animalia
- Phylum: Arthropoda
- Clade: Pancrustacea
- Class: Insecta
- Order: Coleoptera
- Suborder: Polyphaga
- Infraorder: Cucujiformia
- Superfamily: Curculionoidea
- Family: Curculionidae
- Genus: Rhinusa
- Species: R. linariae

Binomial name
- Rhinusa linariae (Panzer, 1792)

= Rhinusa linariae =

Species of beetle

Rhinusa linariae, the root-gall weevil, is a species of true weevil in the family of beetles known as Curculionidae.
