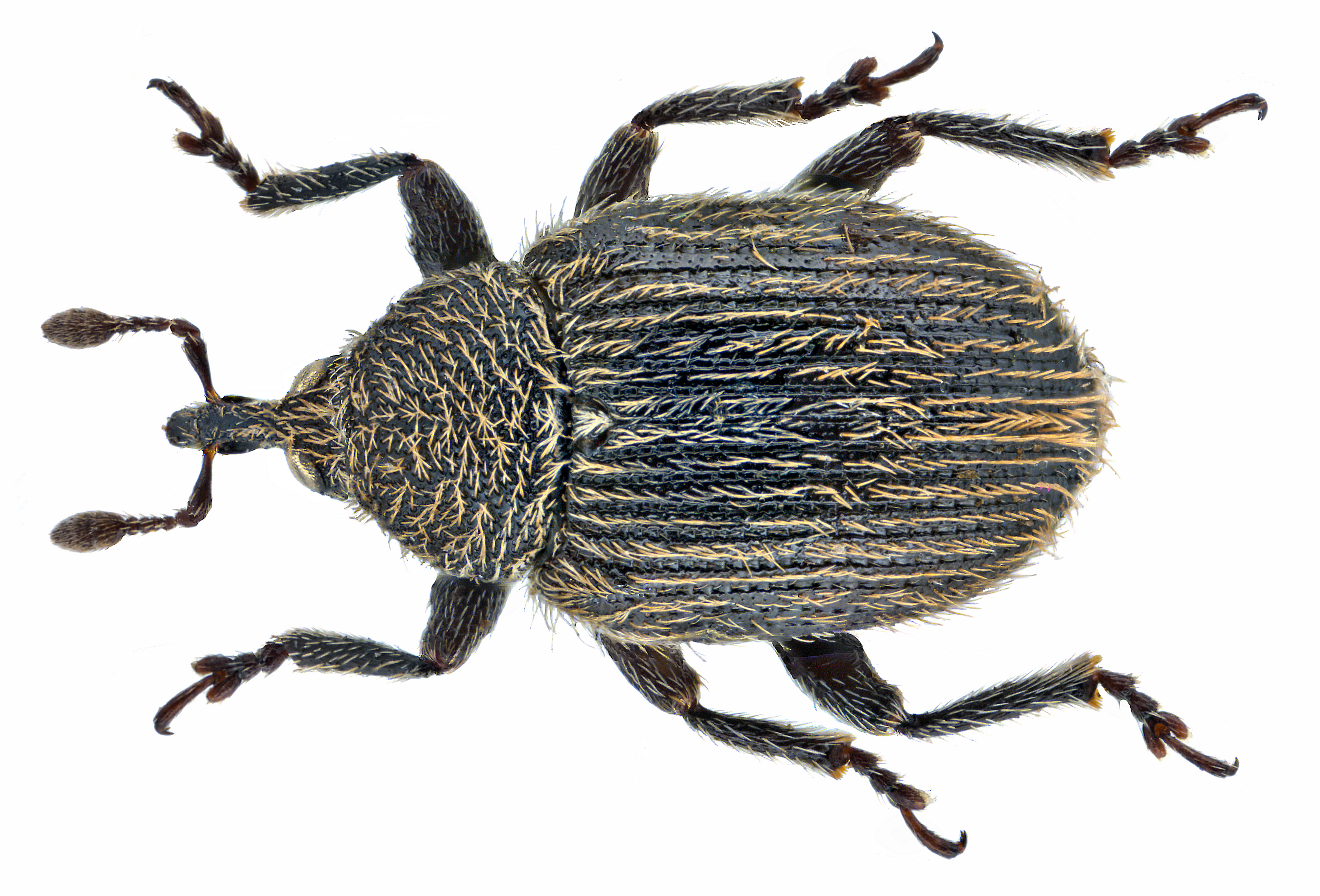
- Gymnetron antirrhini 2,7 mm (2,5-3,1 mm)

Scientific classification
- Kingdom: Animalia
- Phylum: Arthropoda
- Clade: Pancrustacea
- Class: Insecta
- Order: Coleoptera
- Suborder: Polyphaga
- Infraorder: Cucujiformia
- Superfamily: Curculionoidea
- Family: Curculionidae
- Genus: Gymnetron
- Species: G. antirrhini

Binomial name
- Gymnetron antirrhini (Paykull, 1800)

= Gymnetron antirrhini =

Species of beetle

Gymnetron antirrhini is a species of weevil native to Europe.
