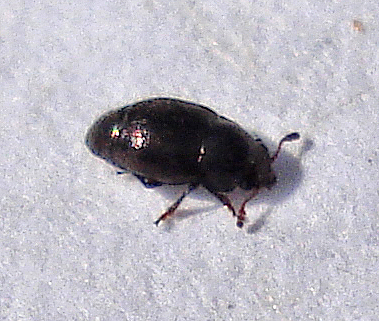

Scientific classification
- Kingdom: Animalia
- Phylum: Arthropoda
- Clade: Pancrustacea
- Class: Insecta
- Order: Coleoptera
- Suborder: Polyphaga
- Infraorder: Cucujiformia
- Family: Kateretidae
- Genus: Brachypterus; Kugelann, 1794

= Brachypterus =

Genus of beetles

Brachypterus is a genus of short-winged flower beetles in the family Kateretidae. There are about 18 described species in Brachypterus.

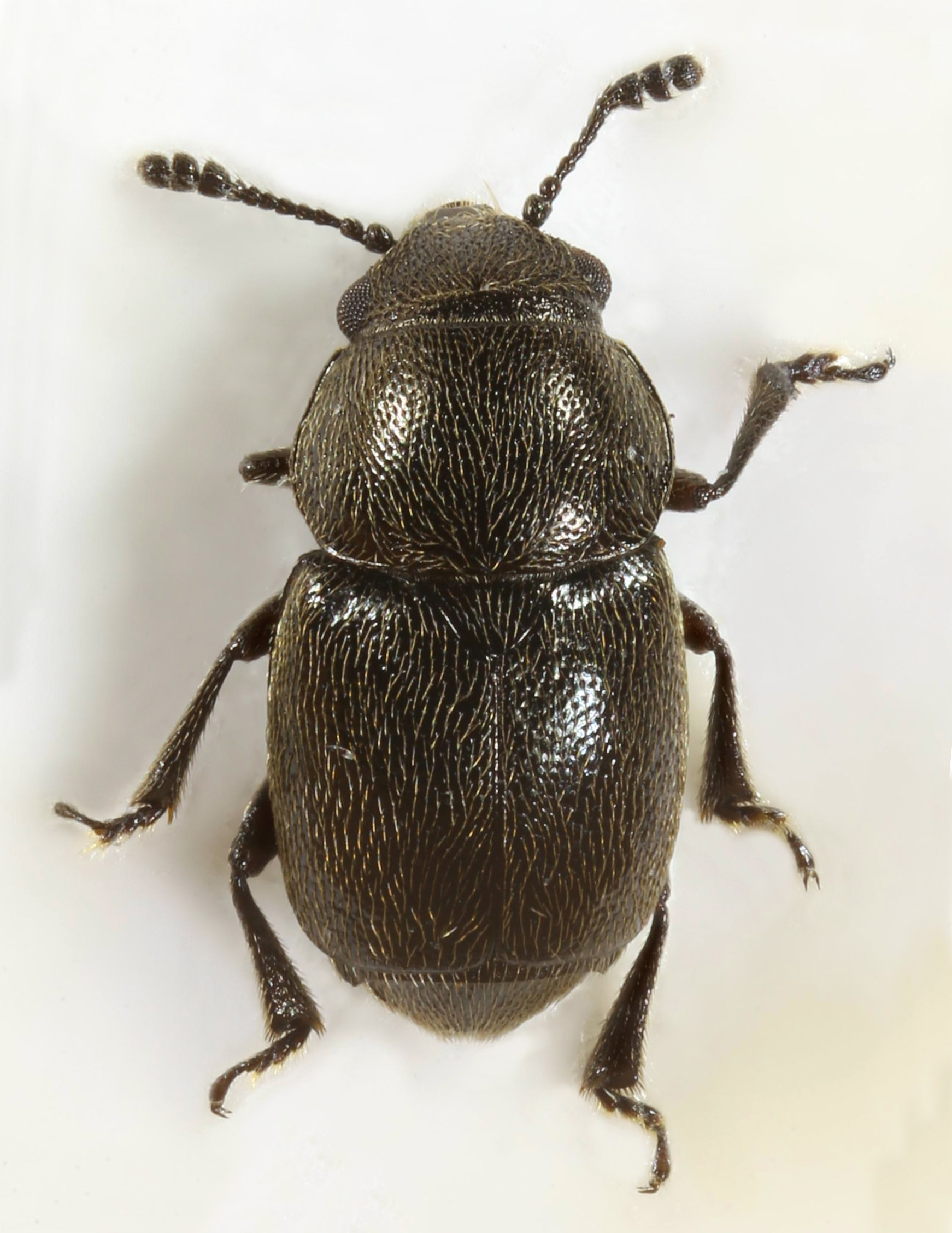

== Species ==
These 18 species belong to the genus Brachypterus:

- Brachypterus aeneomicans Wollaston, 1865
- Brachypterus capensis
- Brachypterus curtulus Wollaston, 1864
- Brachypterus exaratus Dejean, 1836
- Brachypterus fulvipes Erichson, 1843
- Brachypterus glaber (Newman, 1834)
- Brachypterus globularius Murray, 1864
- Brachypterus horii (Hisamatsu, 1976)
- Brachypterus labiatus Erichson, 1843
- Brachypterus longimanus (Wollaston, 1864)
- Brachypterus minutus Dejean, 1836
- Brachypterus rotundicollis Murray, 1864
- Brachypterus schaefferi Grouvelle, 1912
- Brachypterus troglodytes Murray, 1864
- Brachypterus urticae (Fabricius, 1792) (nettle pollen beetle)
- Brachypterus velatus Wollaston, 1863
- Brachypterus viridinitens Har.Lindberg, 1950
- Brachypterus yukikoae (Hisamatsu, 1976)
