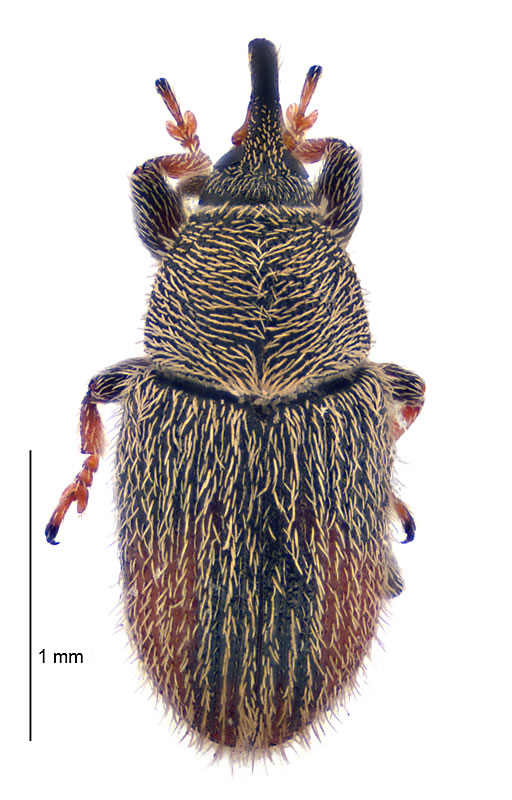
- Mecinus pascuorum

Scientific classification
- Domain: Eukaryota
- Kingdom: Animalia
- Phylum: Arthropoda
- Class: Insecta
- Order: Coleoptera
- Suborder: Polyphaga
- Infraorder: Cucujiformia
- Family: Curculionidae
- Tribe: Mecinini
- Genus: Mecinus; Germar, 1821

= Mecinus =

Genus of beetles

Mecinus is a genus of true weevils in the beetle family Curculionidae. There are at least 90 described species in this genus.

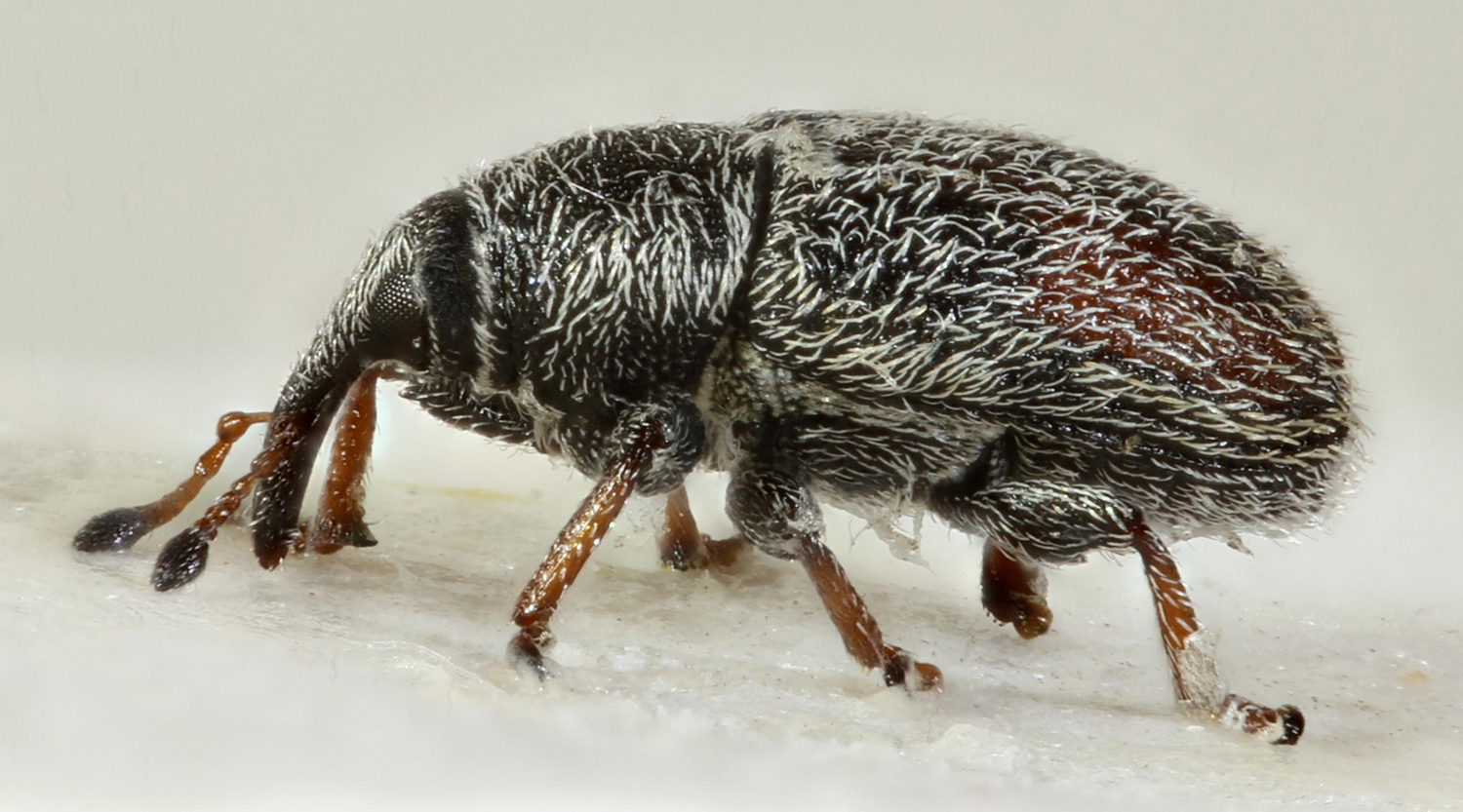
Mecinus pascuorum

== Species ==
These 95 species belong to the genus Mecinus:

- Mecinus aestivus Caldara, 2001^{c}
- Mecinus albipubens Reitter, 1907^{c}
- Mecinus alboscutellatus Caldara, 2001^{c}
- Mecinus alpinus Hustache, 1941^{c}
- Mecinus alternans Kirsch, 1870^{c}
- Mecinus andalusicus Faust, 1890^{c}
- Mecinus angustatus Desbrochers, 1893^{c}
- Mecinus aubei Desbrochers, 1893^{c}
- Mecinus barbarus Gyllenhal, 1838^{c}
- Mecinus bonnairei Caldara, 2001^{c}
- Mecinus brevithorax Desbrochers, 1893^{c}
- Mecinus bulgaricus Angelov, 1971^{c}
- Mecinus caucasicus Caldara, 2001^{c}
- Mecinus cerasi^{c}
- Mecinus circulatus Stephens, 1829^{c}
- Mecinus collaris Dejean, 1821^{c}
- Mecinus comosus Boheman, 1845^{c}
- Mecinus concavirostris Caldara, 2001^{c}
- Mecinus corifoliae Tosevski & Jovic, 2014^{c g}
- Mecinus crassifemur Caldara, 2001^{c}
- Mecinus cuprifer Dejean, 1821^{c}
- Mecinus curvirostris Petri, 1926^{c}
- Mecinus desertorum Caldara, 2001^{c}
- Mecinus dorsalis Aubé, 1850^{c}
- Mecinus echinatus Desbrochers, 1893^{c}
- Mecinus elongatus Caldara, 2001^{c}
- Mecinus erythrocerus Abeille, 1910^{c}
- Mecinus erythrocnemus Abeille de Perrin, 1910^{c}
- Mecinus fairmairei Tournier, 1873^{c}
- Mecinus favarcqi Pic, 1915^{c}
- Mecinus filiformis Aubé, 1850^{c}
- Mecinus fimbriatus Germar, E.F., 1821^{c}
- Mecinus haemorrhoidalis Stephens, 1831^{c}
- Mecinus hariolus Reitter, 1907^{c}
- Mecinus henrici Caldara, 2001^{c}
- Mecinus hesteticus Vitale, 1906^{c}
- Mecinus heydeni Wencker, 1866^{c}
- Mecinus horridulus Desbrochers, 1893^{c}
- Mecinus humeralis Tournier, 1873^{c}
- Mecinus ianthinus Germar, 1821^{g}
- Mecinus ictericus Caldara, 2001^{c}
- Mecinus janthiniformis Tosevski & Caldara in Tosevski, Caldara, Jovic, Hernández-Vera, baviera, Gassmann & Emerson, 2011^{c}
- Mecinus janthinus Thomson, 1865^{c g b} (stem-boring weevil)
- Mecinus kaemmereri Wagner, 1927^{g}
- Mecinus kämmereri Wagner, 1927^{c}
- Mecinus labilis (Herbst, J.F.W., 1795)^{c g}
- Mecinus laeviceps Tournier, 1873^{c g}
- Mecinus latiusculus Caldara, 2001^{c}
- Mecinus limbatus Dejean, 1821^{c}
- Mecinus lineicollis Reitter, 1907^{c}
- Mecinus linnavuorii Caldara, 2001^{c}
- Mecinus longirostris Caldara, 2001^{c}
- Mecinus longiusculus Boheman, 1845^{c}
- Mecinus longulus Caldara, 2001^{c g}
- Mecinus ludyi Caldara, 2001^{c g}
- Mecinus marginatus Germar, E.F., 1821^{c}
- Mecinus marina Caldara, 2001^{c}
- Mecinus marmota Caldara, 2001^{c}
- Mecinus meridionalis Tosevski & Jovic, 2014^{c g}
- Mecinus nasutus Tournier, 1873^{c}
- Mecinus nigronotatus Caldara, 2001^{c}
- Mecinus paratychioides Caldara, 2001^{c}
- Mecinus pascuorum (Gyllenhal, 1813)^{c b}
- Mecinus peterharrisi Tosevski & Caldara, 2014^{c g}
- Mecinus pici Reitter, 1907^{c}
- Mecinus pinastri Dejean, 1821^{c}
- Mecinus pipistrellus Caldara, 2001^{c}
- Mecinus pirazzolii Caldara, 2001^{c}
- Mecinus plantaginis Caldara, 2001^{c}
- Mecinus pyraster (Herbst, 1795)^{i c g b} (stem miner weevil)
- Mecinus raphaelis Baviera & Caldara, 2014^{c g}
- Mecinus reichei Tournier, 1873^{c}
- Mecinus rufipennis Pic, 1915^{c}
- Mecinus sanctus Caldara, 2001^{c}
- Mecinus schneideri Kirsch, 1870^{c}
- Mecinus semicylindricus Dejean, 1821^{c}
- Mecinus seriatus Caldara, 2001^{c}
- Mecinus setosus Kiesenwetter, 1864^{c}
- Mecinus setulosus Pic, 1896^{c}
- Mecinus sicardi Hustache, 1920^{c}
- Mecinus simus Caldara, 2001^{c}
- Mecinus subcylindricus Pic, 1896^{c}
- Mecinus sublineellus Fairmaire, 1880^{c}
- Mecinus suturalis Reitter, 1907^{c}
- Mecinus tanaiticus Arzanov, 2000^{c}
- Mecinus tavaresi Hoffmann, 1958^{c}
- Mecinus teretiusculus Boheman, 1845^{c}
- Mecinus theresae Reitter, 1907^{c}
- Mecinus tournieri Fairmaire, 1876^{c}
- Mecinus tychioides Caldara, 2001^{c}
- Mecinus variabilis Caldara, 2001^{c}
- Mecinus variegatus Sturm, 1826^{c}
- Mecinus venturensis Hoffmann, 1958^{c}
- Mecinus violaceus Dejean, 1821^{c}
- Mecinus zherichini Caldara, 2001^{c}

Data sources: i = ITIS, c = Catalogue of Life, g = GBIF, b = Bugguide.net
