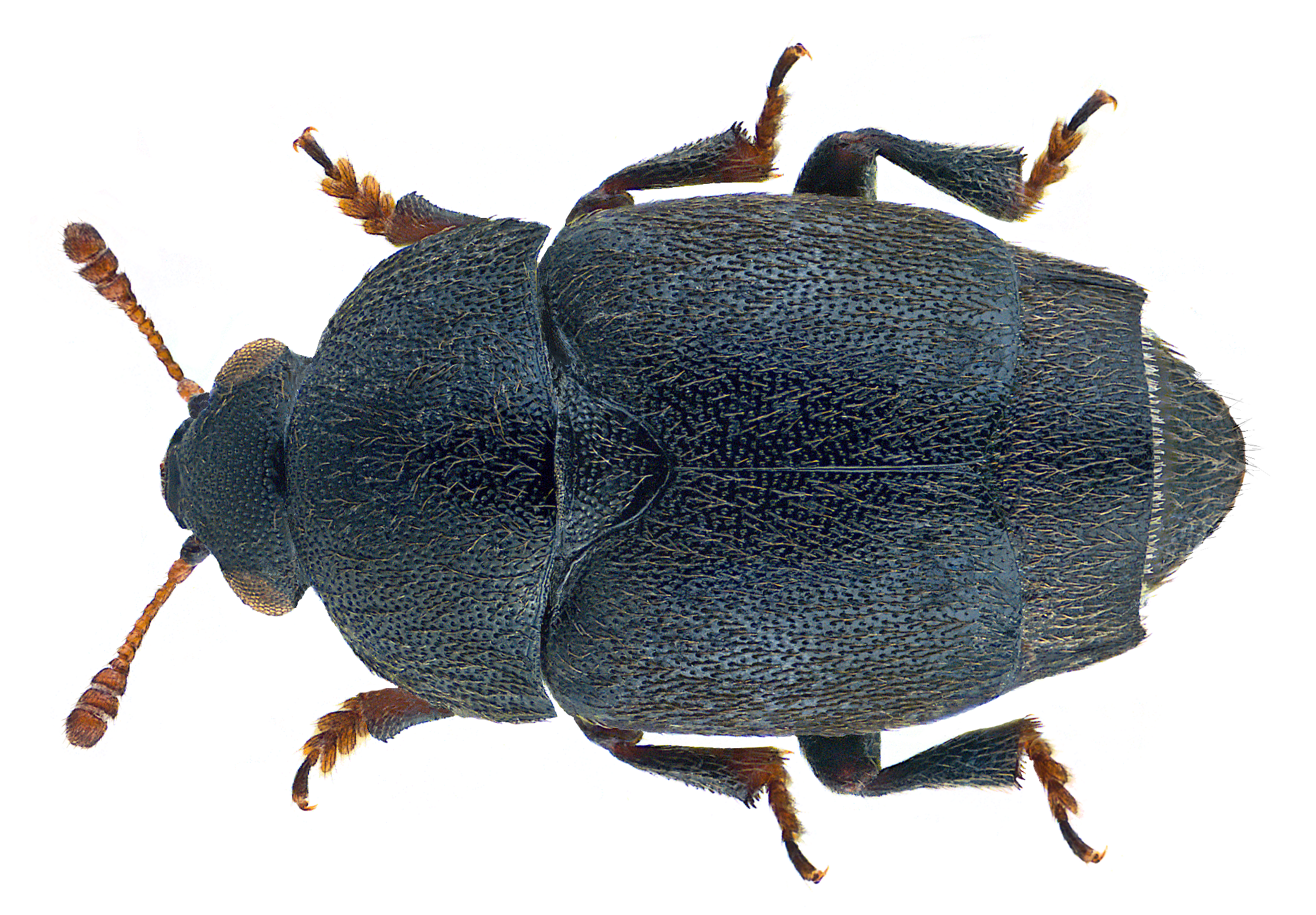
- Brachypterolus linariae

Scientific classification
- Domain: Eukaryota
- Kingdom: Animalia
- Phylum: Arthropoda
- Class: Insecta
- Order: Coleoptera
- Suborder: Polyphaga
- Infraorder: Cucujiformia
- Family: Kateretidae
- Genus: Brachypterolus; Grouvelle, 1913

= Brachypterolus =

Genus of beetles

Brachypterolus is a genus of short-winged flower beetles in the family Kateretidae. There are about six described species in Brachypterolus.

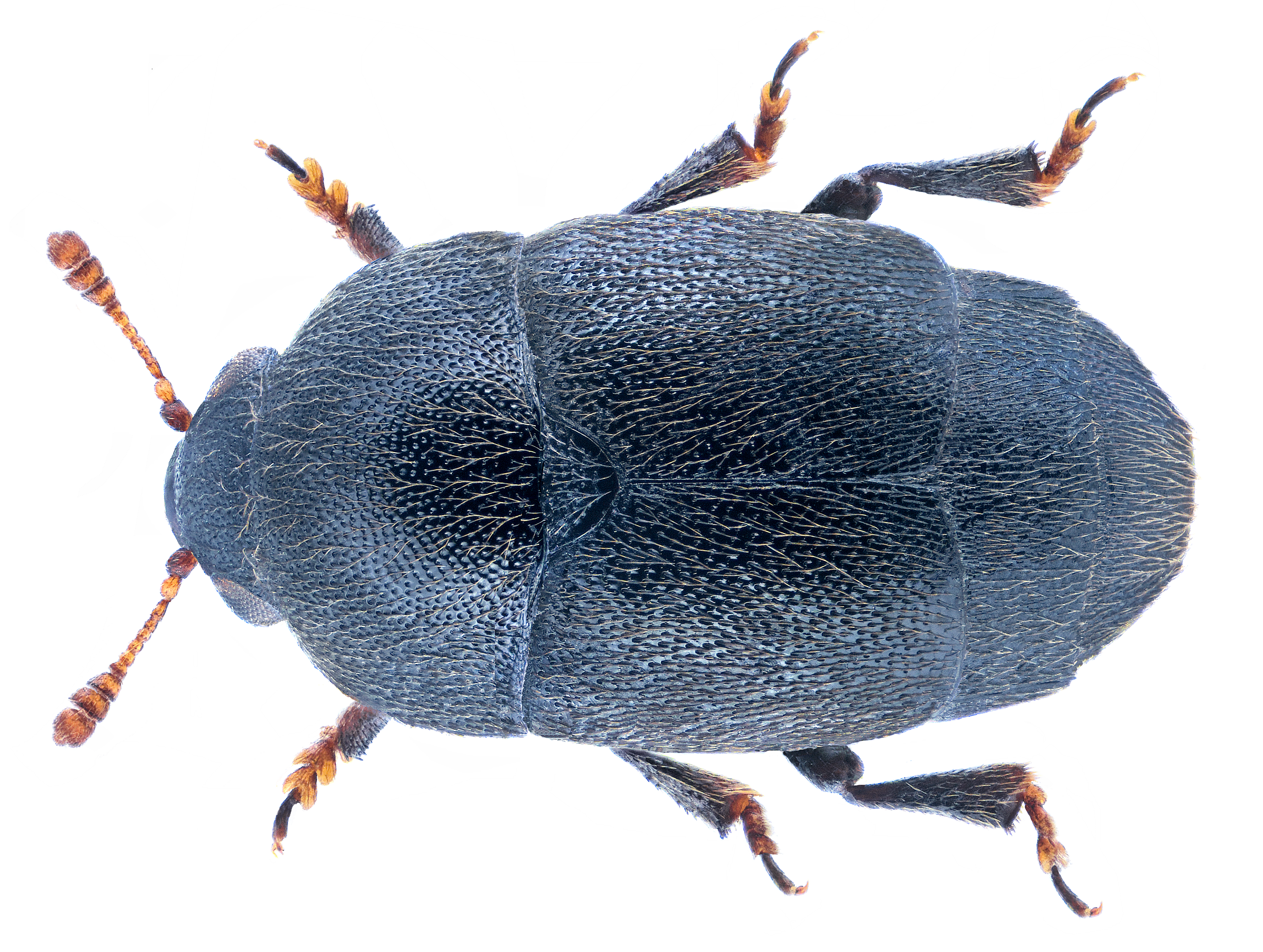
Brachypterolus pulicarius

== Species ==
At least six species belong to the genus Brachypterolus:

- Brachypterolus antirrhini (Murray, 1864)
- Brachypterolus cinereus (Heer, 1841)
- Brachypterolus linariae (Stephens, 1830)
- Brachypterolus longulus (Reitter, 1885)
- Brachypterolus pulicarius (Linnaeus, 1758) (toadflax flower-eating beetle)
- Brachypterolus vestitus (Kiesenwetter, 1850)

== Taxonomy ==
- Brachypterolus shimoyamai Hisamatsu, 1985 is a junior synonym of Brachypterolus pulicarius (Linnaeus, 1758) in Hisamatsu, 2011
