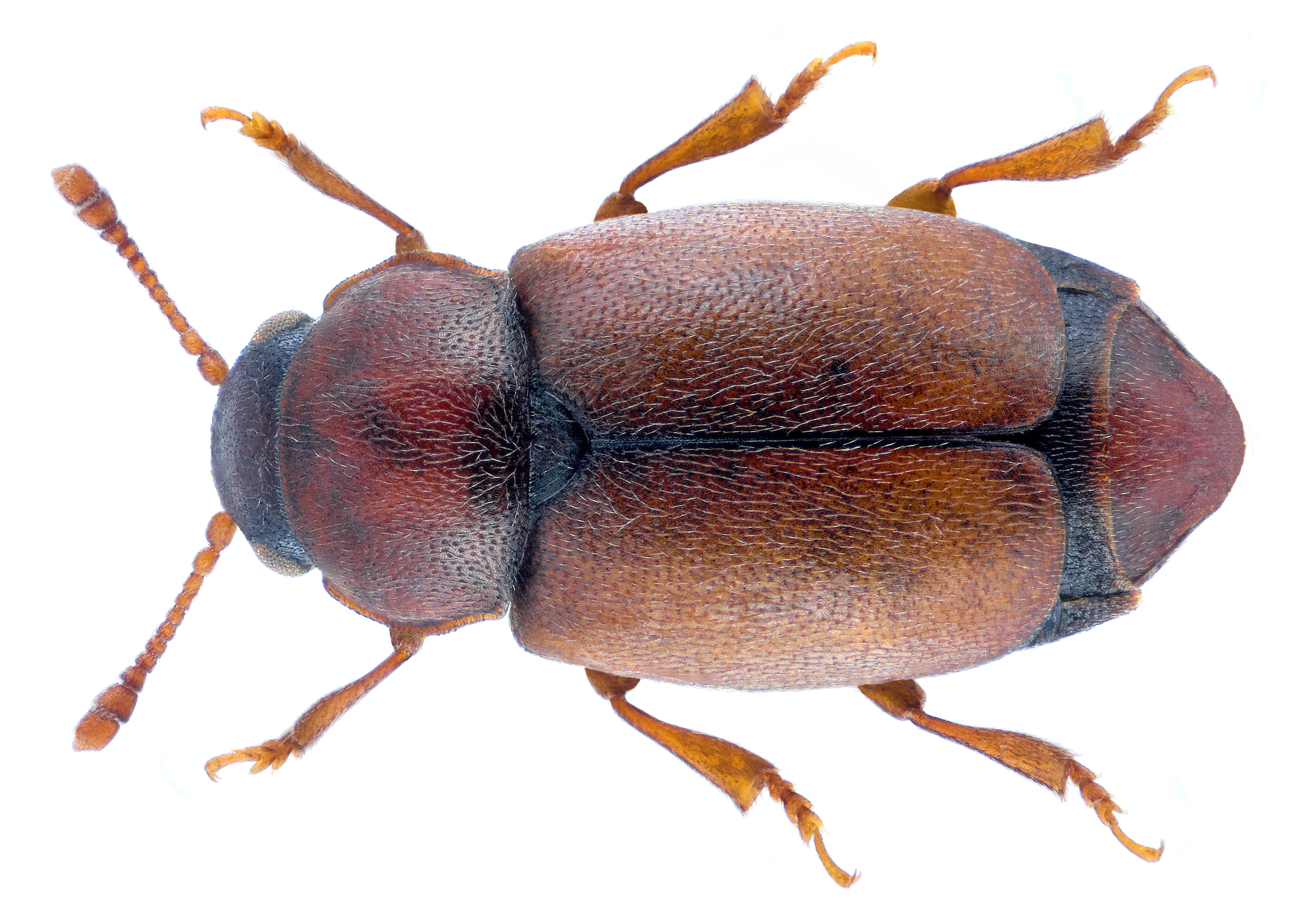
- Heterhelus scutellaris

Scientific classification
- Domain: Eukaryota
- Kingdom: Animalia
- Phylum: Arthropoda
- Class: Insecta
- Order: Coleoptera
- Suborder: Polyphaga
- Infraorder: Cucujiformia
- Family: Kateretidae
- Genus: Heterhelus; DuVal, 1858

= Heterhelus =

Genus of beetles

Heterhelus is a genus of short-winged flower beetles in the family Kateretidae. There are at least four described species in Heterhelus.

== Species ==
These four species belong to the genus Heterhelus:

- Heterhelus abdominalis (Erichson, 1843)
- Heterhelus satoi Hisamatsu & Lee, 2007
- Heterhelus scutellaris (Heer, 1841)
- Heterhelus sericans (LeConte, 1869)
