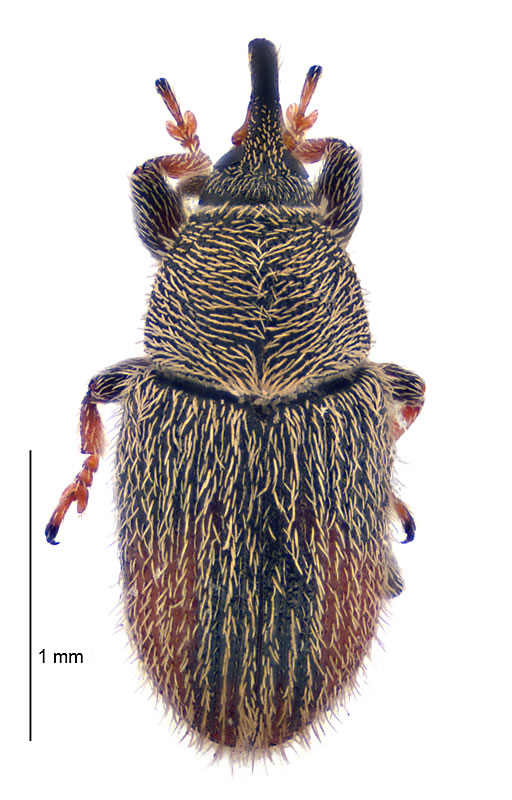
- Mecinus pascuorum

Scientific classification
- Domain: Eukaryota
- Kingdom: Animalia
- Phylum: Arthropoda
- Class: Insecta
- Order: Coleoptera
- Suborder: Polyphaga
- Infraorder: Cucujiformia
- Family: Curculionidae
- Subfamily: Curculioninae
- Tribe: Mecinini; Gistel, 1848

= Mecinini =

Tribe of beetles

Mecinini is a tribe of true weevils in the family of beetles known as Curculionidae. There are at least three genera and about eight described species in Mecinini.

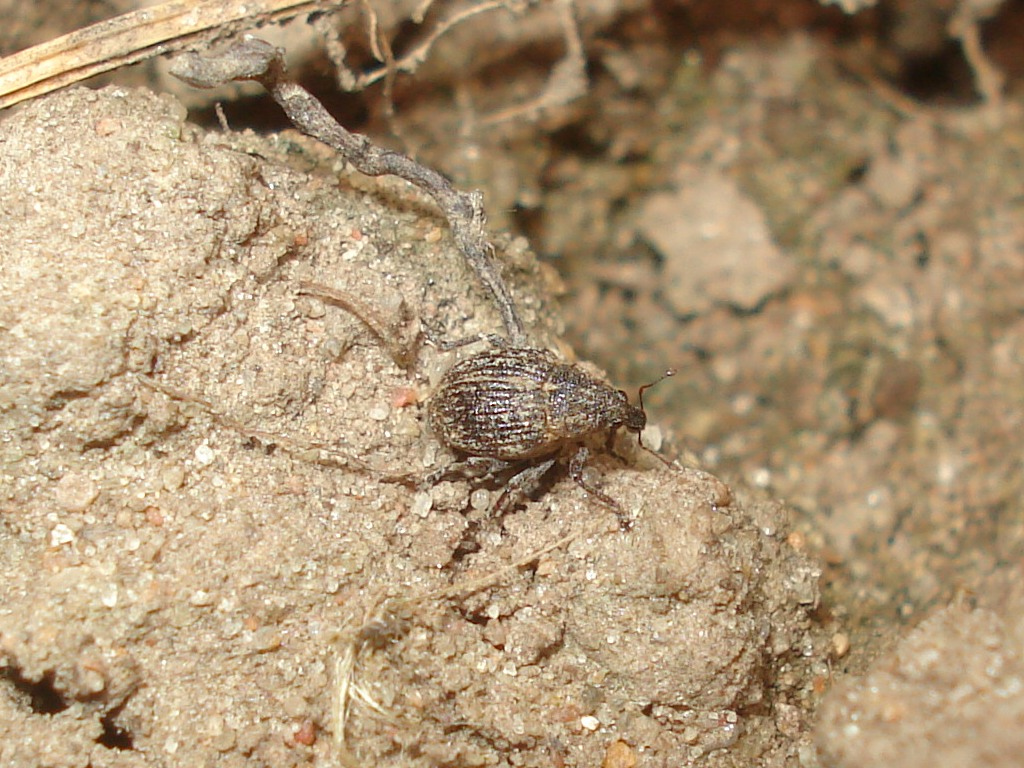
Rhinusa tetra

== Genera ==
These three genera belong to the tribe Mecinini:

- Cleopomiarus Pierce, 1919^{c g b}
- Mecinus Germar, 1821^{i c g b}
- Rhinusa Stephens, 1829^{c g b}

Data sources: i = ITIS, c = Catalogue of Life, g = GBIF, b = Bugguide.net
