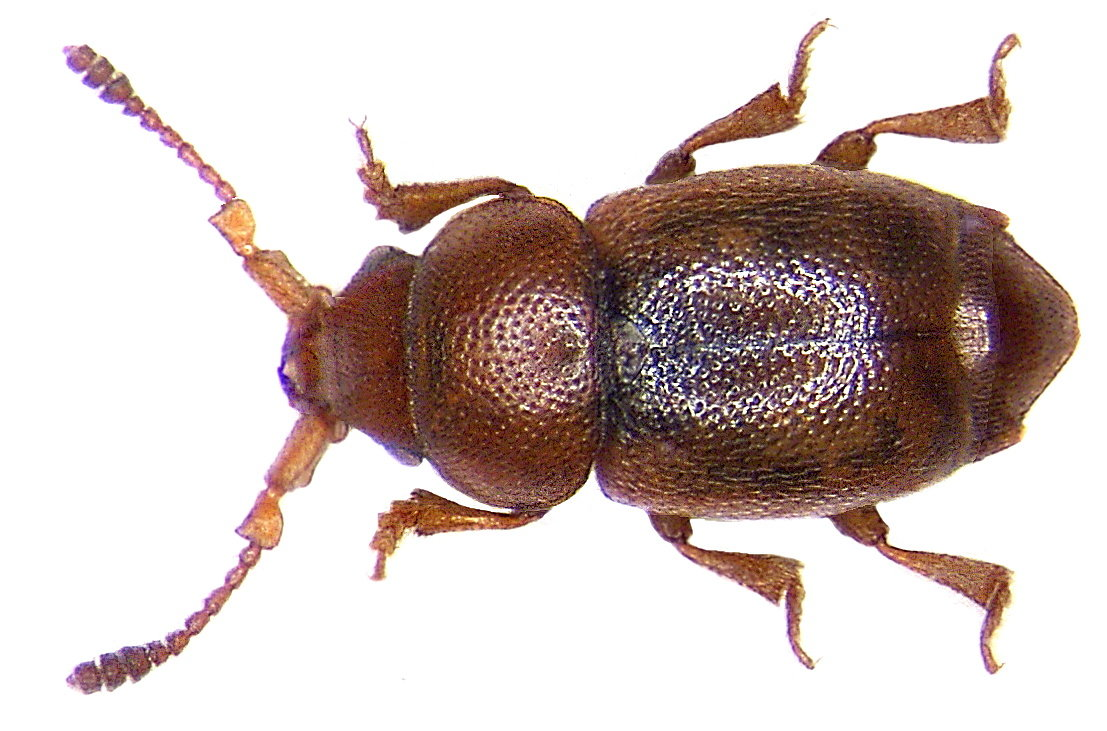
- Kateretes pedicularius

Scientific classification
- Kingdom: Animalia
- Phylum: Arthropoda
- Clade: Pancrustacea
- Class: Insecta
- Order: Coleoptera
- Suborder: Polyphaga
- Infraorder: Cucujiformia
- Superfamily: Cucujoidea
- Family: Kateretidae; Erichson in Agassiz, 1846

Synonyms
- Brachypteridae Erichson, 1845

= Kateretidae =

Kateretidae Temporal range: Barremian–Recent

Family of beetles

Kateretidae also known as short-winged flower beetles are a family of beetles in the superfamily Cucujoidea. There are 10 extant and 4 extinct genera, and at least 40 described species. They are found worldwide except in New Zealand. Adults are anthophagous, feeding on flowers, while the larvae are spermatophagous inside the flower corolla.

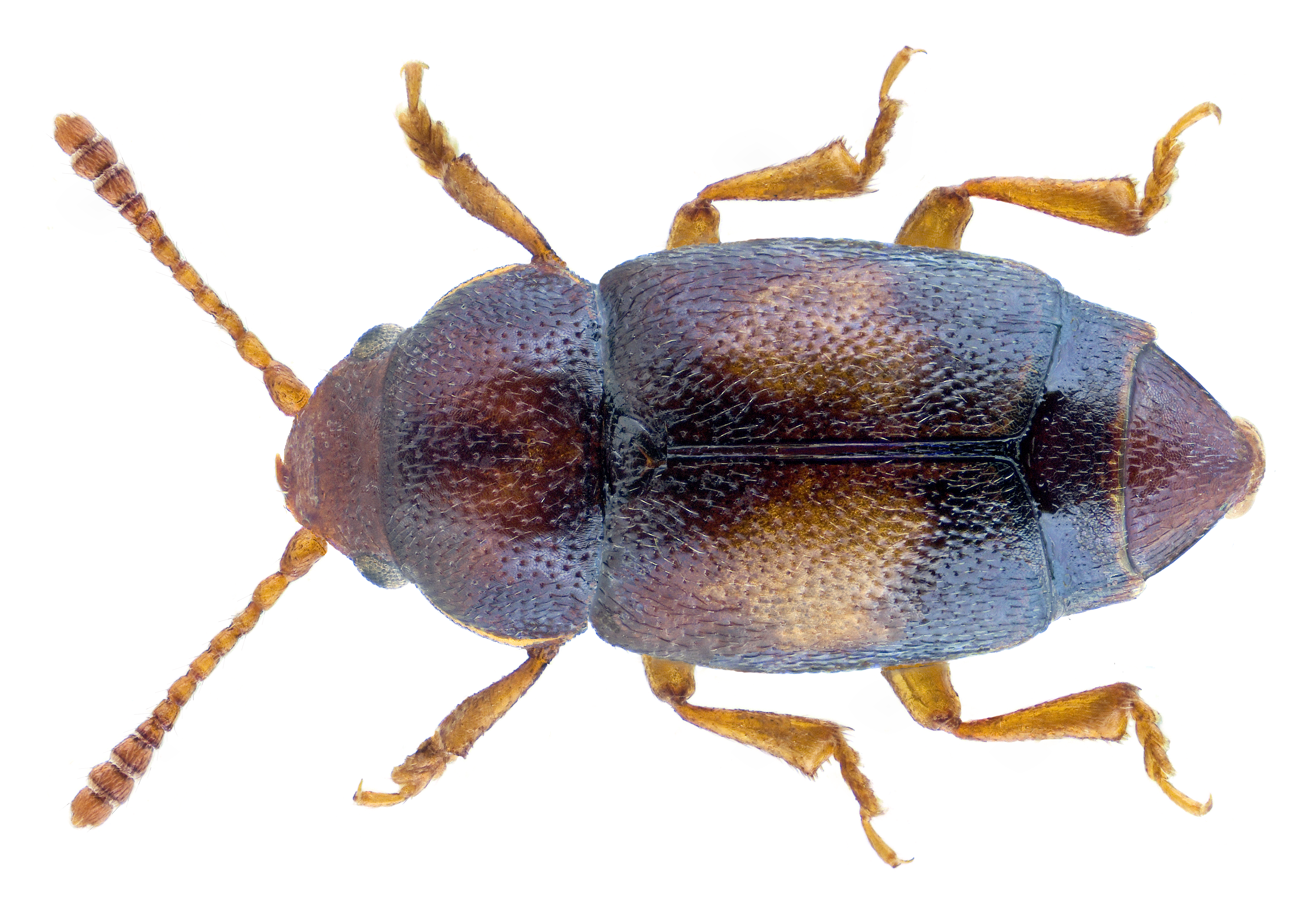
Kateretes pusillus

== Genera ==
- Amartus LeConte, 1861^{i c g b}
- Anamartus Jelinek, 1976^{g}
- Anthonaeus Horn, 1879^{i c g b}
- Boreades Parson, 1943^{i c g}
- Brachyleptus Motschulsky, 1845^{g}
- Brachypterolus Grouvelle, 1913^{i c g b}
- Brachypterus Kugelann, 1794^{i c g b}
- Heterhelus DuVal, 1858^{i c g b}
- Kateretes Herbst, 1793^{i c g b}
- Neobrachypterus Jelínek, 1979^{i c g}
- †Eoceniretes Kirejtshuk & Nel, 2008^{g}

Data sources: i = ITIS, c = Catalogue of Life, g = GBIF, b = Bugguide.net

Fossil taxa Cretaretes, Electrumeretes, Furcalabratum, Pelretes, Polliniretes, Protokateretes and Scaporetes from the Cretaceous Kachin amber from Myanmar, originally described as kateretids, were subsequently argued to be sap beetles belonging to the subfamily Apophisandrinae or members of the separate family Apophisandridae. Pelretes has been described and claimed to have been an pollinator of angiosperms based on it being preserved in amber that also contained angiosperm pollen, much of it in coprolites, although this interpretation has been questioned.
