= List of Pachytychius species =

This is a list of 109 species in Pachytychius, a genus of true weevils in the family Curculionidae.

== Pachytychius species ==
- Pachytychius abeillei Desbrochers, 1892^{c}
- Pachytychius aethiopicus Caldara, 2000^{c}
- Pachytychius albomaculatus Pic, 1905^{c}
- Pachytychius albosparsus Caldara, 1989^{c}
- Pachytychius alepensis Hoffmann, 1958^{c}
- Pachytychius amoenus Leconte, 1876^{c}
- Pachytychius ancora Tournier, 1873^{c}
- Pachytychius antoinei Hoffmann, 1944^{c}
- Pachytychius aridicola Caldara, 1984^{c}
- Pachytychius asperatus Bedel, 1884^{c}
- Pachytychius auricollis Tournier, 1873^{c}
- Pachytychius avulsus Faust, 1885^{c}
- Pachytychius baeticus Kirsch, 1870^{c}
- Pachytychius basimaculata Voss, 1964^{c}
- Pachytychius beardae Caldara, 2000^{c}
- Pachytychius bedeli Chevrolat, 1881^{c}
- Pachytychius behnei Caldara, 1988^{c}
- Pachytychius bifascithorax Escalera, 1914^{c}
- Pachytychius bugnioni Stierlin, 1894^{c}
- Pachytychius cognatus Caldara, 2000^{c}
- Pachytychius congoanus Hustache, 1923^{c}
- Pachytychius curvirostris Hoffmann, 1944^{c}
- Pachytychius deplanatus Desbrochers, 1898^{c}
- Pachytychius difficilis Caldara, 1978^{c}
- Pachytychius discithorax Desbrochers, 1873^{c}
- Pachytychius discoideus Leconte, 1876^{c}
- Pachytychius echidna Caldara, 1978^{c}
- Pachytychius eldae Caldara, 1978^{c}
- Pachytychius elephas Kraatz, 1862^{c}
- Pachytychius erythreensis Hustache, 1932^{c}
- Pachytychius erythropterus Chevrolat, 1879^{c}
- Pachytychius fairmairei Tournier, 1873^{c}
- Pachytychius grandicollis Caldara, 2010^{c}
- Pachytychius granicollis Reitter, 1883^{c}
- Pachytychius granulicollis Tournier, 1874^{c}
- Pachytychius haematocephalus (Gyllenhal, 1836)^{i c b} (gilkicker weevil)
- Pachytychius hierosolymus Desbrochers, 1900^{c}
- Pachytychius hirtipes Hustache, 1939^{c}
- Pachytychius hirtulus Chevrolat, 1879^{c}
- Pachytychius hispidulus Solari, 1932^{c}
- Pachytychius hypocrita Tournier, 1873^{c}
- Pachytychius illectus Faust, 1889^{c}
- Pachytychius indicus Tournier, 1873^{c}
- Pachytychius insularis Chevrolat, 1875^{c}
- Pachytychius jakobsoni Legalov, 2007^{c}
- Pachytychius kirschi Tournier, 1873^{c}
- Pachytychius krugeri Solari, 1939^{c}
- Pachytychius lacordairei Tournier, 1873^{c}
- Pachytychius laticollis Desbrochers, 1898^{c}
- Pachytychius latithorax Pic, 1902^{c}
- Pachytychius latus Jekel, 1861^{c}
- Pachytychius letourneuxi Desbrochers, 1891^{c}
- Pachytychius leucoloma Jekel, H., 1861^{c}
- Pachytychius lineipennis Klima, 1934^{c}
- Pachytychius longipilis Reitter, 1909^{c}
- Pachytychius lostiae Solari, 1939^{c}
- Pachytychius lucasi Jekel, 1861^{c}
- Pachytychius lyali Caldara, 2000^{c}
- Pachytychius maculosus Klima, 1934^{c g}
- Pachytychius marmoreus Desbrochers, 1895^{c}
- Pachytychius mazaganicus Escalera, 1914^{c}
- Pachytychius melillensis Escalera, 1914^{c}
- Pachytychius mungonis Marshall, 1915^{c}
- Pachytychius nivalis Korotyaev, 1987^{c}
- Pachytychius oberprieleri Caldara, 2000^{c}
- Pachytychius obscuricollis Voss, 1960^{c}
- Pachytychius obsoletus Desbrochers, 1898^{c}
- Pachytychius pachyderus Fairmaire, 1870^{c}
- Pachytychius pardoi Hoffmann, 1952^{c}
- Pachytychius phytonomoides Escalera, 1914^{c}
- Pachytychius picteti Tournier, 1873^{c}
- Pachytychius puncticollis Reitter, 1873^{c}
- Pachytychius quadrifasciatipennis Escalera, 1914^{c}
- Pachytychius rifensis Hustache, 1936^{c}
- Pachytychius robustus Wollaston, 1854^{c}
- Pachytychius rotroui Pic, 1925^{c}
- Pachytychius rotundicollis Desbrochers, 1896^{c}
- Pachytychius rubriceps Rosenhauer, 1856^{c}
- Pachytychius scabricollis Rosenhauer, 1856^{c}
- Pachytychius schusteri Reitter, 1909^{c}
- Pachytychius scrobiculatus Rosenhauer, 1856^{c}
- Pachytychius sellatus (Lucas, H., 1846)^{c g}
- Pachytychius setosus Marshall, 1950^{c}
- Pachytychius siculus Desbrochers, 1891^{c}
- Pachytychius simillimus Desbrochers, 1891^{c}
- Pachytychius simulans Caldara, 2010^{c}
- Pachytychius sinaiticus Caldara, 2010^{c}
- Pachytychius smyrnensis Desbrochers, 1891^{c}
- Pachytychius sobrinus Tournier, 1873^{c}
- Pachytychius solidus Faust, 1885^{c}
- Pachytychius sparsutus Jekel, 1861^{c}
- Pachytychius squamosus Acloque, 1896^{c}
- Pachytychius striatellus Caldara, 2000^{c}
- Pachytychius strumarius Tournier, 1873^{c}
- Pachytychius subasper Fairmaire, 1870^{c}
- Pachytychius subcordatus Desbrochers, 1894^{c}
- Pachytychius subcostatus Kol., 1858^{c}
- Pachytychius subcylindricus Reitter, 1890^{c}
- Pachytychius summorum Peyerimhoff, 1943^{c}
- Pachytychius talgarensis Legalov, 2007^{c}
- Pachytychius transcaucasicus Pic, 1913^{c}
- Pachytychius transmutatus Voss, 1962^{c}
- Pachytychius transversicollis Fairmaire, 1877^{c}
- Pachytychius trapezicollis Tournier, 1873^{c}
- Pachytychius trimacula Rosenhauer, 1856^{c}
- Pachytychius tuberculatus Caldara, 2000^{c}
- Pachytychius tychioides Desbrochers, 1900^{c}
- Pachytychius undulatus Desbrochers, 1873^{c}
- Pachytychius viciae Marshall, 1938^{c}

Data sources: i = ITIS, c = Catalogue of Life, g = GBIF, b = Bugguide.net
