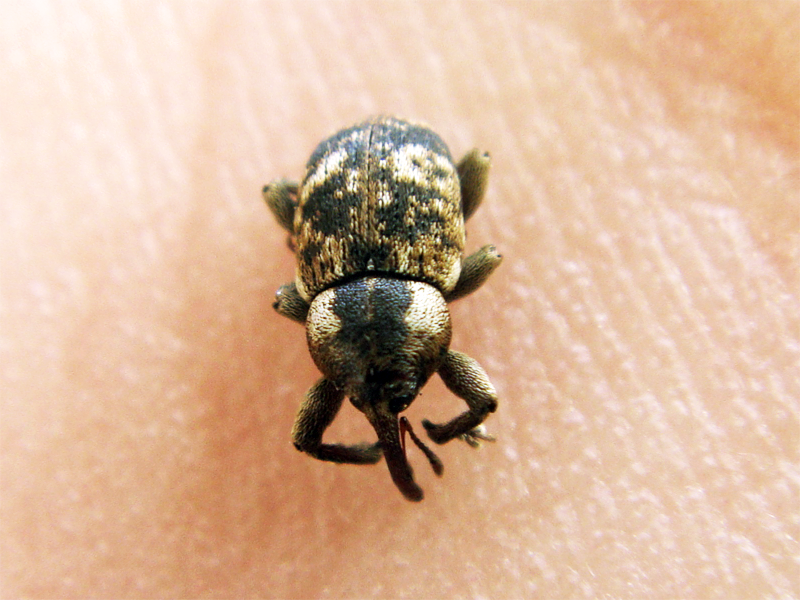

Scientific classification
- Kingdom: Animalia
- Phylum: Arthropoda
- Clade: Pancrustacea
- Class: Insecta
- Order: Coleoptera
- Suborder: Polyphaga
- Infraorder: Cucujiformia
- Family: Curculionidae
- Genus: Pachytychius
- Species: P. haematocephalus

Binomial name
- Pachytychius haematocephalus (Gyllenhal, 1836)

= Pachytychius haematocephalus =

Species of beetle

Pachytychius haematocephalus, the gilkicker weevil, is a species of true weevil in the family of beetles known as Curculionidae. It is found in North America, and in the area from whence its name derives, Fort Gilkicker, in Gosport, Hampshire, UK.
