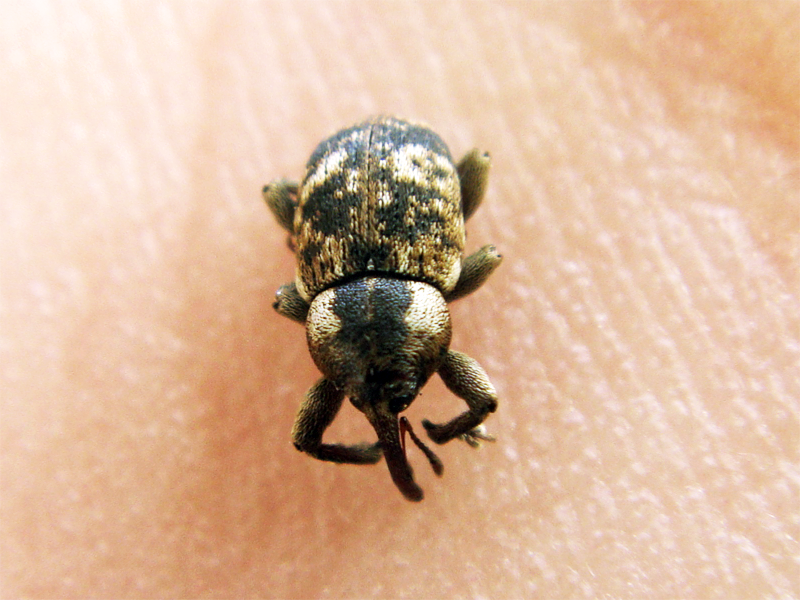
- Pachytychius haematocephalus

Scientific classification
- Kingdom: Animalia
- Phylum: Arthropoda
- Class: Insecta
- Order: Coleoptera
- Suborder: Polyphaga
- Infraorder: Cucujiformia
- Family: Curculionidae
- Tribe: Storeini
- Genus: Pachytychius; Jekel, 1861

Diversity
- at least 100 species

= Pachytychius =

Genus of beetles

Pachytychius is a genus of true weevils in the beetle family Curculionidae. There are at least 110 described species in Pachytychius.

== See also ==
- List of Pachytychius species
