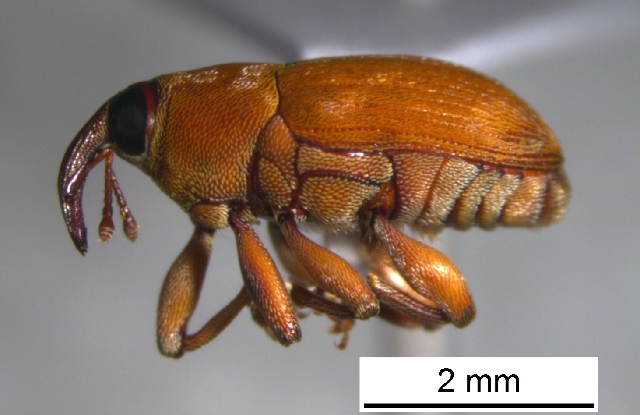

Scientific classification
- Kingdom: Animalia
- Phylum: Arthropoda
- Clade: Pancrustacea
- Class: Insecta
- Order: Coleoptera
- Suborder: Polyphaga
- Infraorder: Cucujiformia
- Superfamily: Curculionoidea
- Family: Curculionidae
- Subfamily: Baridinae
- Tribe: Madarini
- Genus: Zyzzyva; Casey, 1922

Type species
- Zyzzyva ochreotecta Casey, 1922

Species
- Z. rufula Hustache 1951; Z. ochreotecta Casey, 1922

= Zyzzyva =

Genus of beetles

Zyzzyva (/ˈzɪzɪvə/ ZIH-zih-və) is a genus of South American weevils, often found on or near palm trees. It was first described in 1922 by Thomas Lincoln Casey Jr., based on specimens obtained in Brazil by Herbert Huntingdon Smith.

Casey describes Zyzzyva ochreotecta in his book Memoirs on the Coleoptera, Volume 10:

Rather broadly oblong-oval, convex, densely clothed with scales, ochreous and very uniform above, completely concealing the sculpture; beak (♂) scarcely longer than the prothorax, thick, distinctly arcuate, compressed basally, finely, closely punctate, longitudinally furrowed and carinate above; antennae obscure rufous; prothorax two-fifths wider than long, the sides parallel and nearly straight in basal two-fifths, thence oblique and nearly straight to the apex, which is truncate and much less than half as wide as the base; parallel scales dense and directed longitudinally in great part; elytra a third longer than wide, a fifth or sixth wider than the prothorax and nearly two and one-half times as long, the sides parallel, broadly, circularly rounded in apical third, the sutural angle not reëntrant; pygidium closely but not densely clothed with slender and suberect pale squamules; under surface without sexual mark, the first ventral suture fine but very distinct throughout, the others coarse, the fourth not reflexed at the sides. Length 4.3 mm.; width 2.0 mm. Brazil (Santarem). One specimen.

== Etymology ==
Casey is commonly credited with naming the genus, although the etymology of the word is unclear. One theory is that the word was inspired by Zyzza, a former genus of leafhoppers. An entomologist at New York's Museum of Natural History speculated that Casey made up the word as a joke, "to have the last word."

Zyzzyva has achieved notoriety for being the last word in several English-language dictionaries. The Scrabble word-study program Zyzzyva is named after the genus.

== Species ==
There are three accepted species within this genus.

- Zyzzyva ochreotecta Casey, 1922
- Zyzzyva rufula Hustache, 1951
- Zyzzyva squamosa (C.H.Boheman, 1844)

== See also ==
- Aaaaba
- Aaadonta
- Zyzzogeton, a leafhopper, another "last entry"
- Zyzzyxdonta alata
- Zyzzyzus
- Zzyzx (disambiguation)
