= Petracca =

Petracca is a surname. Notable people with the surname include:

- Christian Petracca (born 1996), Australian rules footballer
- Joseph Petracca (1913–1963), American novelist, short story writer, screenwriter, and television writer of Italian descent
- Michael Petracca, American novelist
