= Zyzzyxdonta alata =

Conservation status
- Vulnerable (IUCN 3.1)

Scientific classification
- Kingdom: Animalia
- Phylum: Mollusca
- Class: Gastropoda
- Order: Stylommatophora
- Family: Endodontidae
- Genus: Zyzzyxdonta
- Species: Z. alata

Binomial name
- Zyzzyxdonta alata Solem, 1976

Species of gastropod

Zyzzyxdonta alata is a species of air-breathing land snail, a terrestrial pulmonate gastropod mollusk in the family Endodontidae.

This is the only species in the genus Zyzzyxdonta. The genus was named Zyzzyxdonta because it has many features that are the opposite to the genus Aaadonta. The name, given to the snail by malacologist Alan Solem, is the last word in many species dictionaries, just after Zyzzyx; however, they both, in fact, precede Zyzzyzus.

They live in the Pacific islands of Palau and Fiji.

== Description ==
The shell of Zyzzyxdonta alata has apical sculpture typical of the Endodontidae. The postnuclear whorls have widely spaced radial ribs which protrude into hollow, winglike structures at the carinated periphery.

There are about 5 whorls that are rather loosely coiled. The apex is flat, but the spire is slightly elevated.

The body whorl has a protruded, keeled periphery, not descending more rapidly, with a distinct subperipheral sulcus. The umbilicus is widely open and U-shaped. The last whorl does not decoil as rapidly. The apertural barriers consist of three parietals, a single columellar one that slants downwards, and three long palatals. All barriers have large, swollen and serrated beads above them.

== See also ==
- Aaaaba
- Aaadonta
- Zyzzyva
- Zyzzyzus
