= Alcinous (disambiguation) =

Alcinous was a mythological king featured prominently in Homer's Odyssey.

Alcinous may also refer to:

- Alcinous (philosopher), Middle Platonist philosopher
- 11428 Alcinoös, a minor planet
- Alcinous, a genus of sea spider and original taxonym of the Aaaaba beetle
