= Aaadonta constricta komakanensis =

Conservation status
- Critically endangered, possibly extinct (IUCN 3.1)

Scientific classification
- Kingdom: Animalia
- Phylum: Mollusca
- Class: Gastropoda
- Order: Stylommatophora
- Family: Endodontidae
- Genus: Aaadonta
- Species: A. constricta
- Subspecies: A. c. komakanensis

Trinomial name
- Aaadonta constricta komakanensis Solem, 1976

Subspecies of gastropod

Aaadonta constricta komakanensis is a subspecies of land snail, a terrestrial pulmonate gastropod mollusk in the family Endodontidae. It is endemic to Palau, where it was previously known from Koror, but has not been seen since 1936. If it is still extant, it is threatened by destruction or modification of its habitat.
