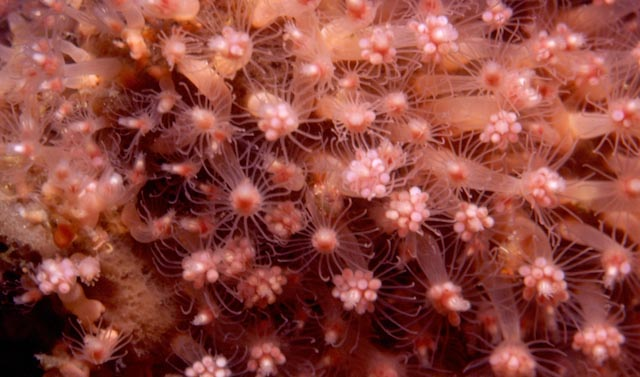

Scientific classification
- Kingdom: Animalia
- Phylum: Cnidaria
- Class: Hydrozoa
- Order: Anthoathecata
- Family: Tubulariidae
- Genus: Zyzzyzus
- Species: Z. warreni

Binomial name
- Zyzzyzus warreni Calder, 1988

= Zyzzyzus warreni =

Species of cnidarian

Zyzzyzus warreni, the tubular sponge hydroid, is a species of hydroid cnidarian. It is a member of the family Tubulariidae. These animals usually grow embedded in sponges.

== Description ==
Zyzzyzus warreni grows to about 1.5 cm (0.6 in) tall. It has a fat stem and a daisy-like polyp with sparse tentacles surrounding a group of reproductive sporosacs which in turn surround the pink and white oral tentacles. The body of the hydranths (feeding individuals) as well as the gonophores (reproductive polyps) are pinky red, while the tentacles are transparent white.

== Distribution and habitat ==
This species is found around the South African coast from Saldanha Bay to KwaZulu-Natal as well as off the Cape Verde Islands, Trinidad and Bermuda. It is also known from Brazil, Colombia, the Netherlands Antilles, Puerto Rico and Japan. It occurs in various habitats where the sponges on which it feeds live, including rocky shores, quiet coastal waters, bays and on mangrove roots. It is known from the subtidal to at least 30 m (100 ft) underwater.

== Ecology ==
At breeding time, female gonophores contain one to four actinulae (mobile tentaculate larvae), and these are released into the water column in a series of pulsations over the course of a few minutes. They can not actively swim but are attracted towards suitable species of sponge on which to settle, and may be attracted by the presence of chemical cues emitted by the sponge. They can settle within ten minutes on favourable substrates and can survive for about three days if no suitable substrate can be found. When settled, they quickly undergo metamorphosis and the new polyps that form develop tentacles and start feeding in about two days.
