= A. constricta =

A. constricta may refer to:

- Aaadonta constricta, a land snail species endemic to Palau
- Acacia constricta, the whitethorn acacia, a shrub species native to Mexico and the southwestern United States
- Alstonia constricta, the quinine bush or bitterbark, a shrub species endemic to Australia
