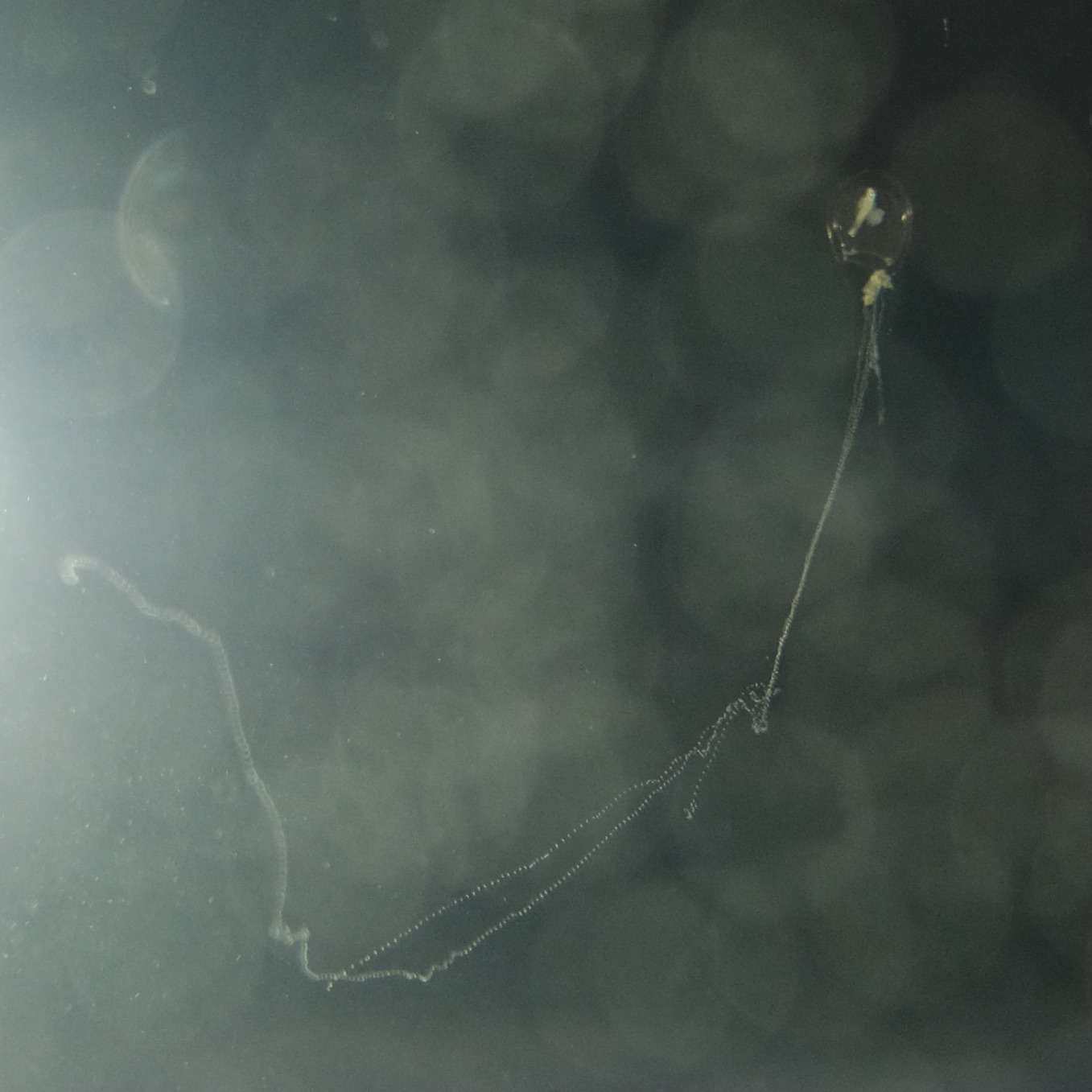

Scientific classification
- Domain: Eukaryota
- Kingdom: Animalia
- Phylum: Cnidaria
- Class: Hydrozoa
- Order: Anthoathecata
- Family: Tubulariidae
- Genus: Hybocodon
- Species: H. prolifer

Binomial name
- Hybocodon prolifer Agassiz, 1862

= Hybocodon prolifer =

Species of Hydrozoa

Hybocodon prolifer is a species of Hydrozoa belonging to the family Tubulariidae.

It was first described in 1860 by Louis Agassiz.

H. prolifer has a cosmopolitan distribution and is distinct from the other species of Hybocodon in its medusoid stage by the fact that it buds medusa from the tentacular bulb bearing its single moniliform tentacle.
