= Aaadonta constricta babelthuapi =

Conservation status
- Critically Endangered (IUCN 3.1)

Scientific classification
- Kingdom: Animalia
- Phylum: Mollusca
- Class: Gastropoda
- Order: Stylommatophora
- Family: Endodontidae
- Genus: Aaadonta
- Species: A. constricta
- Subspecies: A. c. babelthuapi

Trinomial name
- Aaadonta constricta babelthuapi Solem, 1976

Subspecies of gastropod

Aaadonta constricta babelthuapi is a subspecies of land snail, a terrestrial pulmonate gastropod mollusk in the family Endodontidae. It is endemic to Palau, where it was previously known from Babeldaob and Ngemelis. It is now only known from Ngatpang. It is threatened by destruction or modification of its habitat.
