= Hasidus =

Hasidus may refer to:

- the Hasidic movement in Judaism
- a beetle of the weevil genus in the tribe Madarini, see Hasidus (weevil)
