= Hybocodon atentaculatus =

Scientific classification
- Domain: Eukaryota
- Kingdom: Animalia
- Phylum: Cnidaria
- Class: Hydrozoa
- Order: Anthoathecata
- Family: Tubulariidae
- Genus: Hybocodon
- Species: H. atentaculatus

Binomial name
- Hybocodon atentaculatus Uchida, 1948

Species of Hydrozoa

Hybocodon atentaculatus is a species of Hydrozoa belonging to the family Tubulariidae. It was first described in 1948 by Tohru Uchida.
