= E. crocea =

E. crocea may refer to:

- Earias crocea, an African moth
- Ectopleura crocea, an athecate hydroid
- Epthianura crocea, a bird endemic to Australia
- Euproctis crocea, an owlet moth
- Exegetia crocea, a moth with a coilable proboscis
