= Aaadonta fuscozonata fuscozonata =

Conservation status
- Critically Endangered (IUCN 3.1)

Scientific classification
- Kingdom: Animalia
- Phylum: Mollusca
- Class: Gastropoda
- Order: Stylommatophora
- Family: Endodontidae
- Genus: Aaadonta
- Species: A. fuscozonata
- Subspecies: A. f. fuscozonata

Trinomial name
- Aaadonta fuscozonata fuscozonata (Beddome, 1889)

Subspecies of gastropod

Aaadonta fuscozonata fuscozonata is a subspecies of land snail, a terrestrial pulmonate gastropod mollusc in the family Endodontidae. It is endemic to Palau, where it was previously known from Koror, but has only recently been found on a few of the Rock Islands. It is threatened by destruction and modification of its moist lowland forest habitat.
