= Zyzzyzus floridanus =

Scientific classification
- Kingdom: Animalia
- Phylum: Cnidaria
- Class: Hydrozoa
- Order: Anthoathecata
- Family: Tubulariidae
- Genus: Zyzzyzus
- Species: Z. floridanus

Binomial name
- Zyzzyzus floridanus Petersen, 1990

Species of hydrozoan

Zyzzyzus floridanus is a species of marine hydrozoan in the family Tubulariidae. The hydroids grow to 2.2-4.4 mm high, and its 8-15 oral tentacles are 0.15-0.28 mm long. It is a transparent white colour.

== Distribution ==
Z. floridanus is found in the northwestern Atlantic Ocean, along the coast of the United States and Canada. Specimens were found west of Long Reef in Miami, United States, at a depth of 2 m (6 ft 7 in) embedded in the sponge Callyspongia aculeata.
