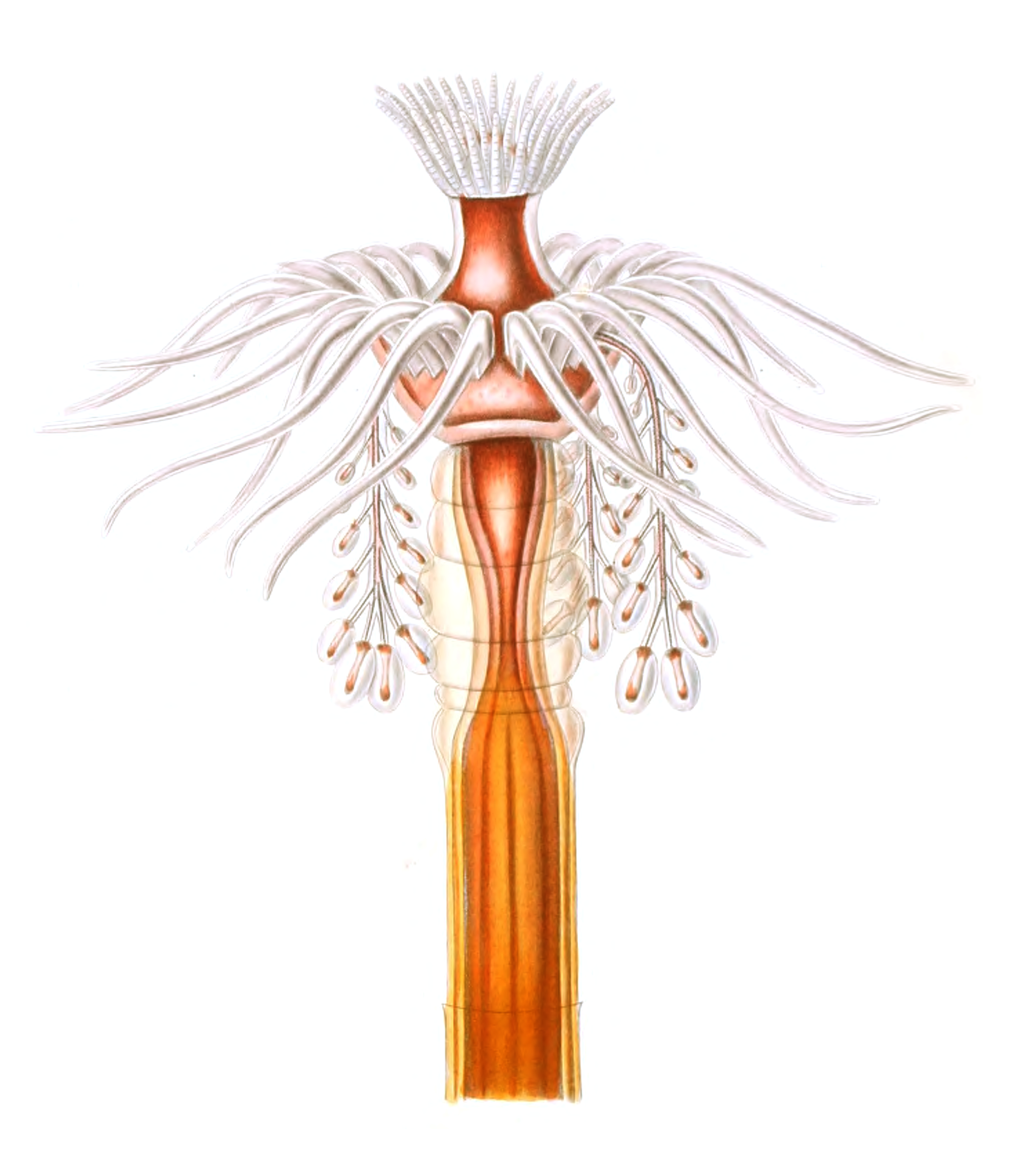

Scientific classification
- Domain: Eukaryota
- Kingdom: Animalia
- Phylum: Cnidaria
- Class: Hydrozoa
- Order: Anthoathecata
- Family: Tubulariidae
- Genus: Tubularia; Linnaeus, 1758

Species
- Tubularia acadiae; Tubularia amoyensis; Tubularia asymmetrica; Tubularia aurea; Tubularia couthouyi; Tubularia harrimani; Tubularia hodgsoni; Tubularia indivisa; Tubularia longstaffi; Tubularia regalis

= Tubularia =

Genus of hydrozoans

Tubularia is a genus of hydroids resembling furry pink tufts or balls at the end of long strings, spawning the common name as either the pink-mouthed or pink-hearted hydroid.

== Description ==
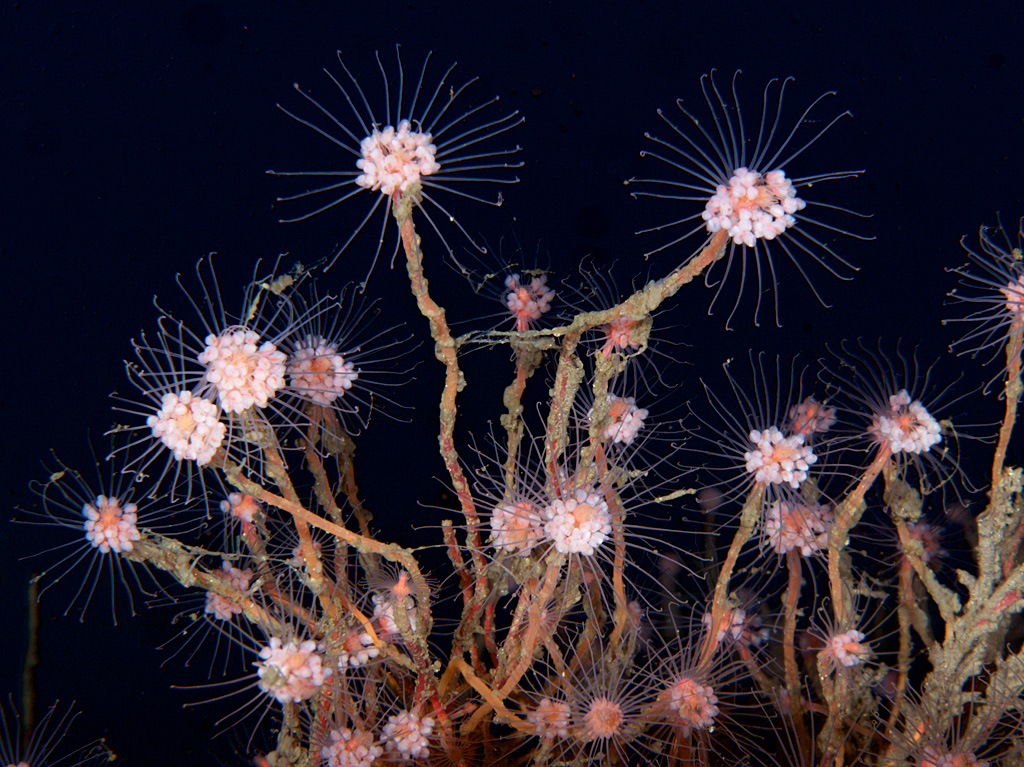
Tubularia indivisa

The average height of an individual colony is 4–6 centimetres (1 1/2–2 1/2 inches) and the diameter of the polyp and tentacles is 1 cm (1/2 in).

Tubularia occurs either individually or in colonies, both being dioecious and possessing large, brilliantly coloured, flowerlike hydrants. Medusae remain attached to the hypostome in clusters, never being dispersed.

=== Life cycle ===
During the summer, sperm are released into the water and attracted to female reproductive structures by means of a chemical substance. Internal fertilization occurs in the female medusoids. The fertilized eggs develop into actinula. These larvae develop directly into a new polyp. Although the medusa are attached to the polyp, the life cycle resembles that of typical Cnidarian with the polyp reproducing asexually and the medusa producing egg and sperm.

=== Similar taxa ===
Tubularia indivisa may be difficult to distinguish from Ectopleura larynx, with the two often growing together. The stems of E. larynx are branched while those of T. indivisa are not.
