= Hybocodon cryptus =

Scientific classification
- Kingdom: Animalia
- Phylum: Cnidaria
- Class: Hydrozoa
- Order: Anthoathecata
- Family: Tubulariidae
- Genus: Hybocodon
- Species: H. cryptus

Binomial name
- Hybocodon cryptus Watson, 1984

Species of hydrozoan

Hybocodon cryptus is a species of tubularian hydrozoan in the family Tubulariidae. It is known around southern Port Phillip Bay and Bass Strait, growing and reproducing at temperatures of at least 10 °C on sponges, often on sandy surfaces of rocks between late autumn and winter.

== Description ==
Hydrocauli up to 3 cm, total height of up to 8 cm. Solitary and unbranched greenish-yellow stems. 12-18 transparent aboral tentacles, 2.5 mm long, white oral tentacles. As a medusa, it has a diameter of 0.5 mm, with a single tentacle from a yellowish marginal bulb. Margin of the bell is slightly oblique, and a scattering of nematocysts on the exumbrella.
