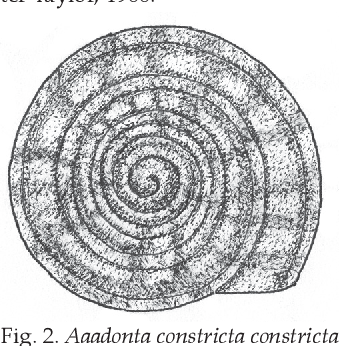

Conservation status
- Critically Endangered (IUCN 3.1)

Scientific classification
- Kingdom: Animalia
- Phylum: Mollusca
- Class: Gastropoda
- Order: Stylommatophora
- Family: Endodontidae
- Genus: Aaadonta
- Species: A. constricta
- Subspecies: A. c. constricta

Trinomial name
- Aaadonta constricta constricta (Semper, 1874)

= Aaadonta constricta constricta =

Subspecies of gastropod

Aaadonta constricta constricta is a subspecies of land snail, a terrestrial pulmonate gastropod mollusk in the family Endodontidae.

It is considered an alternate representation of Aaadonta constricta (Semper, 1874)

It is endemic to Palau. It is threatened by destruction or modification of its habitat.
