= Hybocodon octopleurus =

Scientific classification
- Kingdom: Animalia
- Phylum: Cnidaria
- Class: Hydrozoa
- Order: Anthoathecata
- Family: Tubulariidae
- Genus: Hybocodon
- Species: H. octopleurus

Binomial name
- Hybocodon octopleurus Kao, Li & L.i.Chang, 1958

Species of hydrozoan

Hybocodon octopleurus is a species of hydrozoan in the family Tubulariidae. The type locality is Chefoo Harbour, in China.

== Description ==
HHybocodon octopleurus has a length of 1.7 mm. The umbrella is bell shaped, almost spherical, its margin at an oblique angle. The dorsal region, known as the exumbrella, has eight meridional nematocyst tracks. A large, cylindrical stomach two thirds the length of the umbrella cavity. Gonads surround the greenish stomach, not the peduncle or yellowish tube-like mouth, which is armed with nematocysts.

This species differs to Hybocodon prolifer as there are eight nematocyst tracks in the exumbrella instead of five.
