= Aaadonta fuscozonata depressa =

Conservation status
- Critically Endangered (IUCN 3.1)

Scientific classification
- Kingdom: Animalia
- Phylum: Mollusca
- Class: Gastropoda
- Order: Stylommatophora
- Family: Endodontidae
- Genus: Aaadonta
- Species: A. fuscozonata
- Subspecies: A. f. depressa

Trinomial name
- Aaadonta fuscozonata depressa Solem, 1976

Subspecies of gastropod

Aaadonta fuscozonata depressa is a subspecies of land snail, a terrestrial pulmonate gastropod mollusk in the family Endodontidae. It is endemic to Palau, where it was only known from the tropical moist lowland forests of Peleliu. It is threatened by destruction and modification of its habitat.
