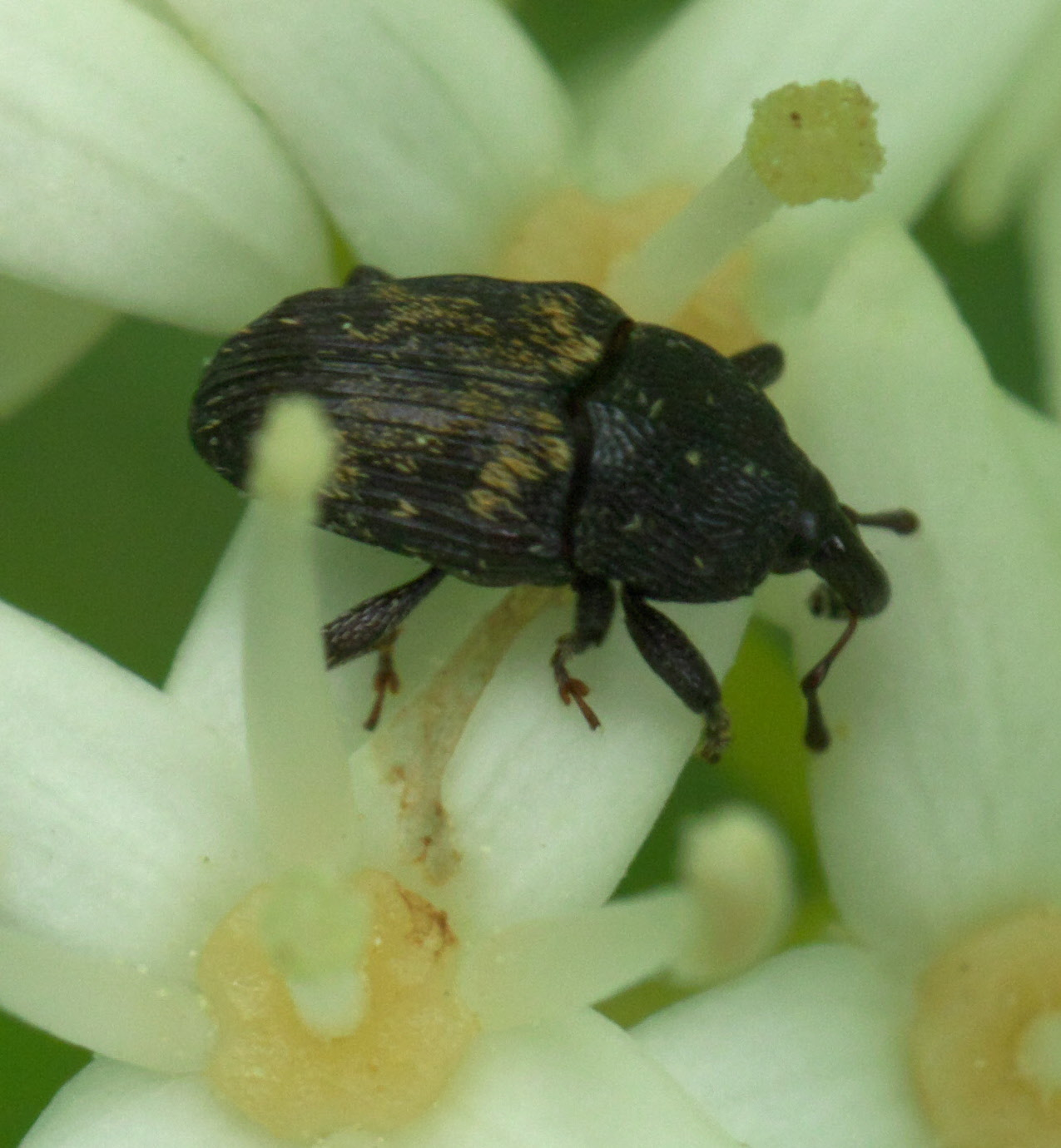
- Glyptobaris lecontei

Scientific classification
- Kingdom: Animalia
- Phylum: Arthropoda
- Class: Insecta
- Order: Coleoptera
- Suborder: Polyphaga
- Infraorder: Cucujiformia
- Family: Curculionidae
- Tribe: Madarini
- Genus: Glyptobaris; Casey, 1892

= Glyptobaris =

Genus of beetles

Glyptobaris is a genus of flower weevils in the family of beetles known as Curculionidae. There are about 15 described species in Glyptobaris.

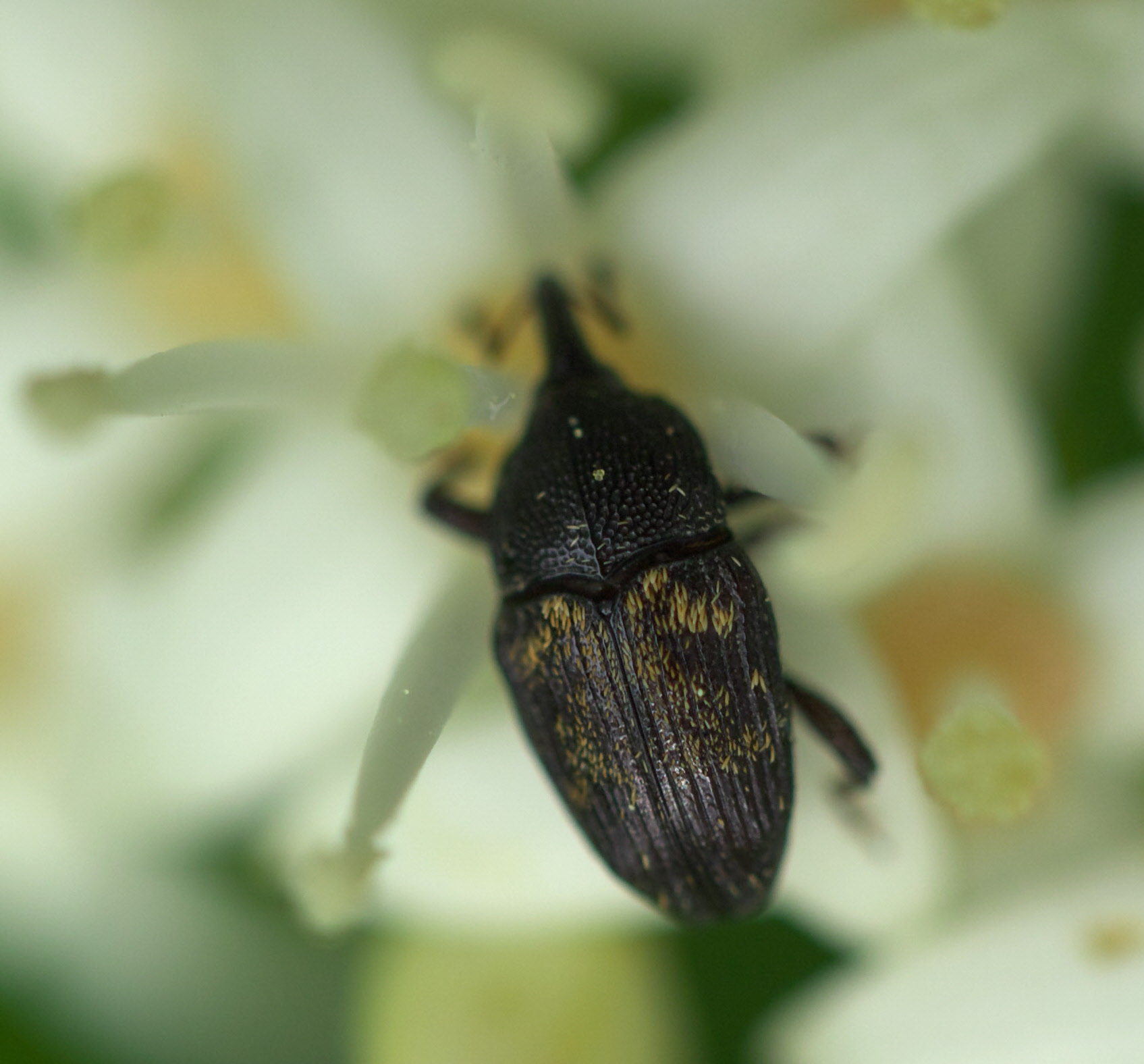
Glyptobaris lecontei

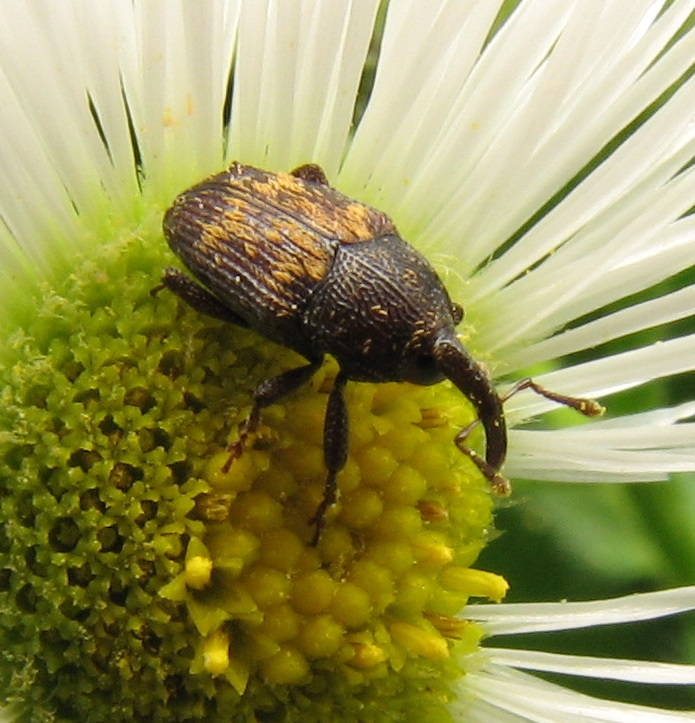
Glyptobaris lecontei on Asteraceae flower

== Species ==
These 15 species belong to the genus Glyptobaris:

- Glyptobaris amazonica Casey, 1922^{c}
- Glyptobaris amnicola Casey, 1922^{c}
- Glyptobaris basalis Bondar, 1946^{c}
- Glyptobaris evulsa Hustache, A., 1938^{c}
- Glyptobaris lecontei Champion, 1909^{i c b}
- Glyptobaris liturata Hustache, A., 1938^{c}
- Glyptobaris nana Hustache, A., 1938^{c}
- Glyptobaris plicicollis Schaufuss, C. [or L.W.?], 1866^{c}
- Glyptobaris rugata Champion, G.C., 1909^{c}
- Glyptobaris rugicollis Casey, T.L., 1892^{c}
- Glyptobaris signatus Bondar, 1946^{c}
- Glyptobaris simplex Champion, G.C., 1909^{c}
- Glyptobaris solarii Champion, G.C., 1909^{c}
- Glyptobaris spinigera Champion, G.C., 1909^{c}
- Glyptobaris viduata Hustache, A., 1938^{c}

Data sources: i = ITIS, c = Catalogue of Life, g = GBIF, b = Bugguide.net
