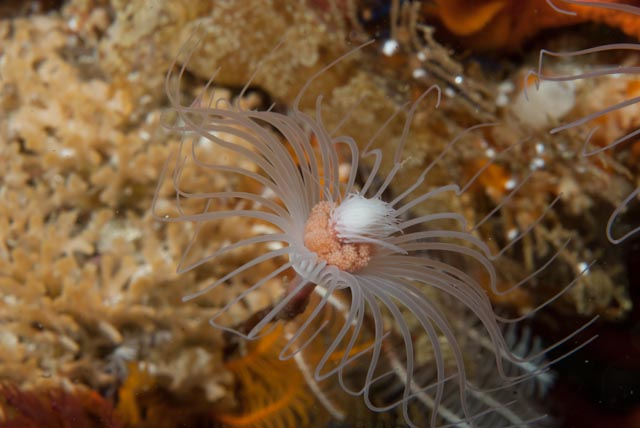
- Ectopleura crocea

Scientific classification
- Kingdom: Animalia
- Phylum: Cnidaria
- Class: Hydrozoa
- Order: Anthoathecata
- Family: Tubulariidae
- Genus: Ectopleura; L. Agassiz, 1862

= Ectopleura =

Genus of hydrozoans

Ectopleura is a genus of hydrozoans in the family Tubulariidae.

== Species ==
The genus contains the following species:

- Ectopleura americana Peterson, 1990
- Ectopleura antarctica (Billard, 1914)
- Ectopleura apicisacciformis Xu, Huang & Guo, 2007
- Ectopleura atentaculata Xu & Huang, 2006
- Ectopleura attenoides (Coughtrey, 1876)
- Ectopleura bethae (Warren, 1908)
- Ectopleura crassocanalis Huang, Xu & Guo, 2011
- Ectopleura crocea (Agassiz, 1862)
- Ectopleura dumortierii (Van Beneden, 1844)
- Ectopleura elongata Lin, Xu, Huang & Wang, 2010
- Ectopleura exxonia (Watson, 1978)
- Ectopleura gemmifera Xu, Huang & Guo, 2007
- Ectopleura grandis Fraser, 1944
- Ectopleura guangdongensis Xu, Huang & Chen, 1991
- Ectopleura indica Petersen, 1990
- Ectopleura integra (Fraser, 1938)
- Ectopleura japonica (Hirohito, 1988)
- Ectopleura larynx (Ellis & Solander, 1786)
- Ectopleura latitaeniata Xu & Zhang, 1978
- Ectopleura marina (Torrey, 1902)
- Ectopleura mayeri Petersen, 1990
- Ectopleura media Fraser, 1948
- Ectopleura minerva Mayer, 1900
- Ectopleura multicirrata Schuchert, 1996
- Ectopleura obypa Migotto & Marques, 1999
- Ectopleura prolifica Hargitt, 1908
- Ectopleura radiata (Uchida, 1937)
- Ectopleura sacculifera Kramp, 1957
- Ectopleura triangularis Lin, Xu, Huang & Wang, 2010
- Ectopleura venusta (Yamada, 1950)
- Ectopleura viridis (Pictet, 1893)
- Ectopleura wrighti Petersen, 1979
- Ectopleura xiamenensis Zhang & Lin, 1984
- Ectopleura xuxuanii Xu, Huang & Guo, 2007
