= Xyzzy =

xyzzy or XYZZY may refer to:

- Xyzzy (computing), a magic word from the Colossal Cave Adventure computer game, later a metasyntactic variable or a video game cheat code
- Xyzzy (mnemonic), memory trick used in mathematics
- XYZZY Awards, for interactive fiction

== See also ==
- Zzyzx (disambiguation)
