= Onychobaris millepora =

Scientific classification
- Domain: Eukaryota
- Kingdom: Animalia
- Phylum: Arthropoda
- Class: Insecta
- Order: Coleoptera
- Suborder: Polyphaga
- Infraorder: Cucujiformia
- Family: Curculionidae
- Genus: Onychobaris
- Species: O. millepora

Binomial name
- Onychobaris millepora Casey, 1892

Species of beetle

Onychobaris millepora is a species of flower weevil in the beetle family Curculionidae. It is found in North America.
