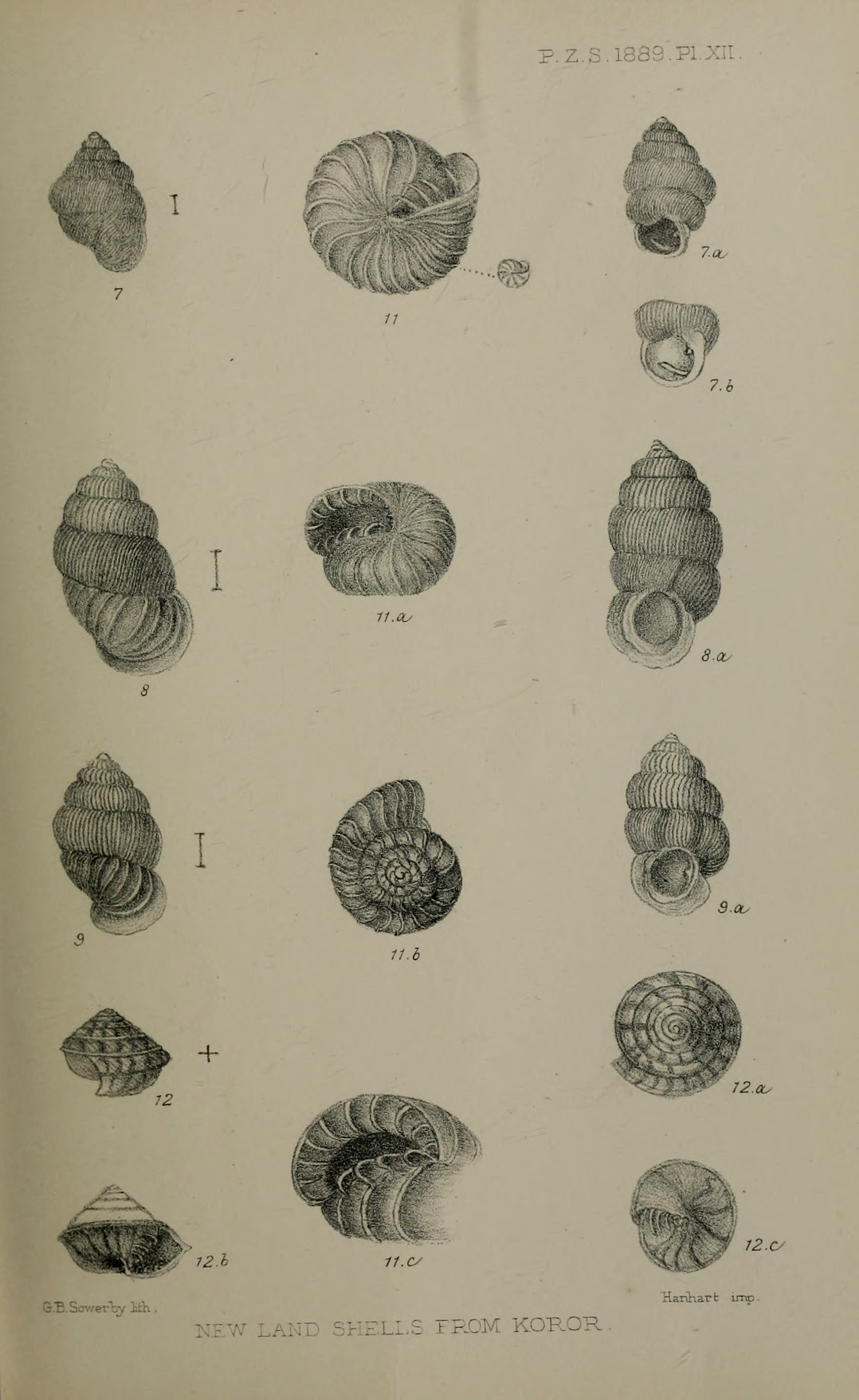
- Illustrations labeled as "12" are examples of Aaadonta fuscozonata shell structure.

Conservation status
- Endangered (IUCN 3.1)

Scientific classification
- Kingdom: Animalia
- Phylum: Mollusca
- Class: Gastropoda
- Order: Stylommatophora
- Family: Endodontidae
- Genus: Aaadonta
- Species: A. fuscozonata

Binomial name
- Aaadonta fuscozonata (Beddome, 1889)

Subspecies
- A. f. depressa; A. f. fuscozonata

Synonyms
- Helix (Endodonta) fusco-zonata Beddome, 1889; Patula fuscozonata (Beddome, 1889)

= Aaadonta fuscozonata =

Species of gastropod

Aaadonta fuscozonata is a species of air-breathing land snail, a terrestrial pulmonate gastropod mollusc in the family Endodontidae. This species is endemic to Palau, where it is known from Koror and Peleliu, and the small islands of Ngemelis and the northern Rock Islands. This snail inhabits tropical moist lowland forest, and is threatened by the destruction and modification of its habitat.

A subspecies was identified by Alan Solem in 1976, Aaadonta fuscozonata depressa.
