= Stictobaris ornatella =

Scientific classification
- Domain: Eukaryota
- Kingdom: Animalia
- Phylum: Arthropoda
- Class: Insecta
- Order: Coleoptera
- Suborder: Polyphaga
- Infraorder: Cucujiformia
- Family: Curculionidae
- Genus: Stictobaris
- Species: S. ornatella

Binomial name
- Stictobaris ornatella Casey, 1920

Species of beetle

Stictobaris ornatella is a species of flower weevil in the beetle family Curculionidae. It is found in North America. Larvae bore into the stems of Amaranth plants from the base of the flowers.
