= Onychobaris pectorosa =

Scientific classification
- Kingdom: Animalia
- Phylum: Arthropoda
- Class: Insecta
- Order: Coleoptera
- Suborder: Polyphaga
- Infraorder: Cucujiformia
- Family: Curculionidae
- Genus: Onychobaris
- Species: O. pectorosa

Binomial name
- Onychobaris pectorosa LeConte, 1876

Species of beetle

Onychobaris pectorosa is a species of flower weevil in the beetle family Curculionidae. It is found in North America.
