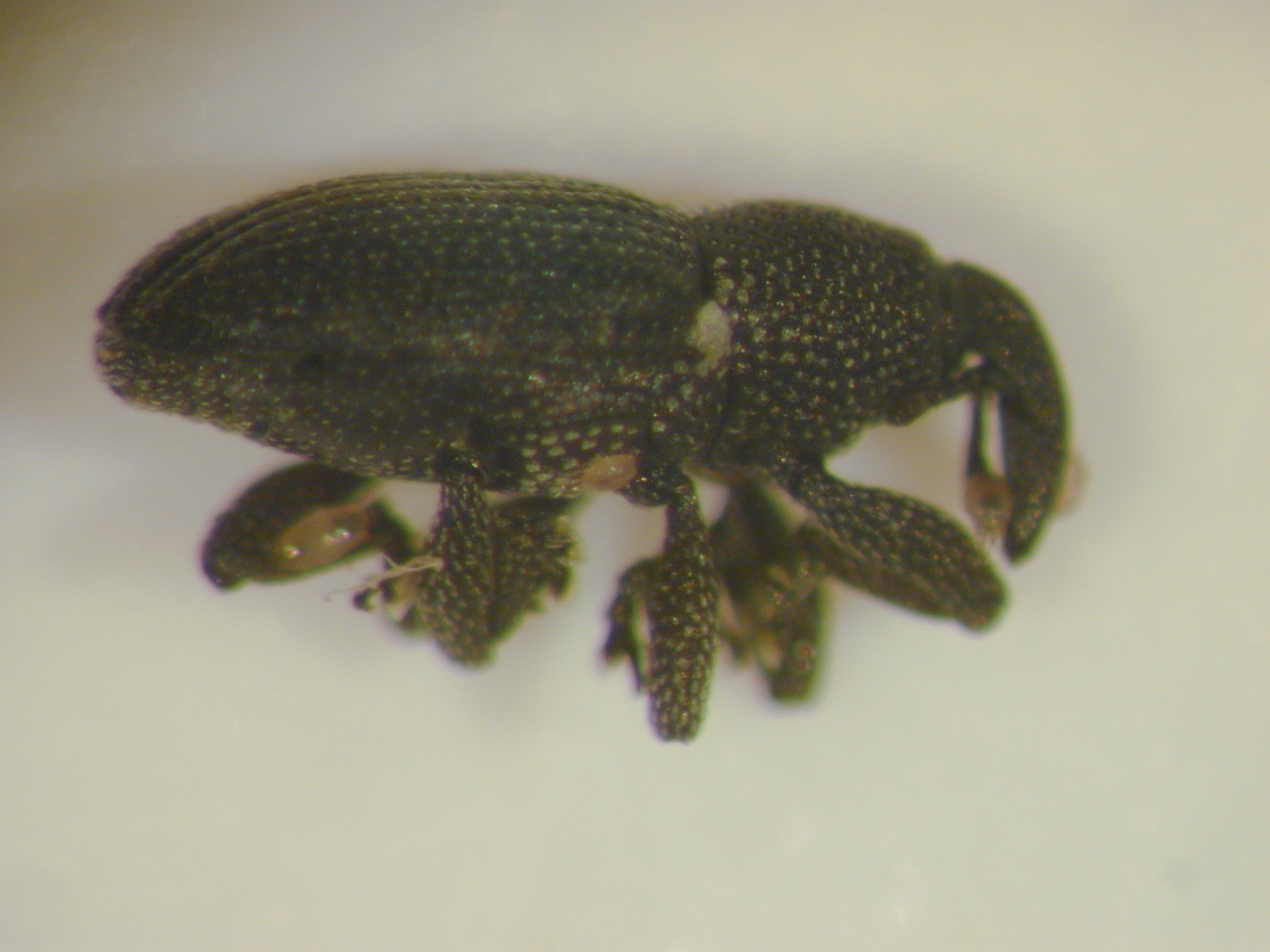
- Acuthopeus cocciniae (Madarini) shows typical features of the Baridinae

Scientific classification
- Domain: Eukaryota
- Kingdom: Animalia
- Phylum: Arthropoda
- Class: Insecta
- Order: Coleoptera
- Suborder: Polyphaga
- Infraorder: Cucujiformia
- Family: Curculionidae
- Subfamily: Baridinae
- Tribe: Madarini; Jekel, 1865

Genera
- See text

= Madarini =

Tribe of beetles

Madarini is a true weevil tribe in the subfamily Baridinae.

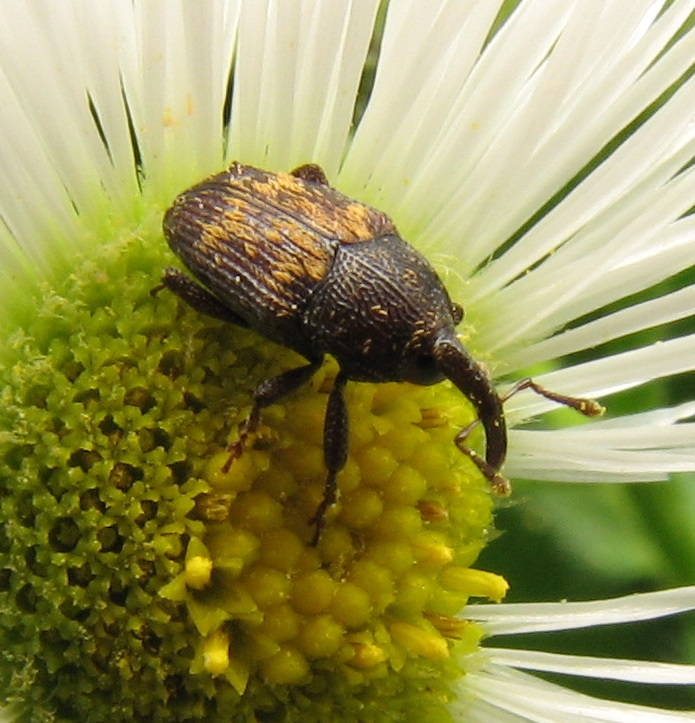
Glyptobaris lecontei

== Genera ==
- Acanthomadarus
- Acythopeus
- Acythophanes
- Ampeloglypter
- Amyctides
- Anazalinus
- Angelocentris
- Anisorrhamphus
- Antesis
- Apolpones
- Aponychius
- Athesapeuta
- Barinogyna
- Barymerus
- Bromesia
- Calandromimus
- Centrinopsimorpha
- Chalcomadaras
- Chapatiella
- Codmius
- Conoproctus
- Crassiopus
- Cropelia
- Cynethia
- Degis
- Dendrobaris
- Diorycaulus
- Elasmorhinus
- Eumycterus
- Eutoxus
- Glyptobaris
- Groatus
- Hasidus
- Hulpes
- Hulpesellus
- Hustachea
- Ipsichora
- Keibaris
- Lepidomyctides
- Leptoschoinus
- Linomadaras
- Liotheantis
- Loboderinus
- Lyterius
- Madarellus
- Madaropsis
- Madarus
- Manilabaris
- Megabaris
- Metanthia
- Micromadarus
- Microrhinus
- Microstrates
- Mimophilus
- Mimophobus
- Myctides
- Myelantiella
- Nanoplaxes
- Neoantesis
- Neomadarus
- Notesia
- Notesiaspis
- Oberprieleria
- Onychobaris
- Orchidophilus
- Pachytheantis
- Palistes
- Paracythopeus
- Parallelodemas
- Paramadarus
- Parapiperis
- Parasolaria
- Parisoschoenus
- Pellobaris
- Physoproctus
- Piperis
- Platyonyx
- Plaxes
- Polpones
- Pseudeutoxus
- Pseudocholus
- Pycnotheantis
- Radamus
- Rytonia
- Simocopis
- Sirabia
- Solaria
- Solariopsis
- Squamispichora
- Stictobaris
- Stripenia
- Theantiella
- Theantis
- Theogama
- Tonesia
- Tripusidia
- Tripusus
- Tropidobaris
- Zalinas
- Zena
- Zyzzyva
