= Onychobaris subtonsa =

Scientific classification
- Kingdom: Animalia
- Phylum: Arthropoda
- Class: Insecta
- Order: Coleoptera
- Suborder: Polyphaga
- Infraorder: Cucujiformia
- Family: Curculionidae
- Genus: Onychobaris
- Species: O. subtonsa

Binomial name
- Onychobaris subtonsa LeConte, 1876

Species of beetle

Onychobaris subtonsa is a species of flower weevil in the beetle family Curculionidae. It is found in North America.
