= Stictobaris cribrata =

Scientific classification
- Kingdom: Animalia
- Phylum: Arthropoda
- Class: Insecta
- Order: Coleoptera
- Suborder: Polyphaga
- Infraorder: Cucujiformia
- Family: Curculionidae
- Genus: Stictobaris
- Species: S. cribrata

Binomial name
- Stictobaris cribrata (LeConte, 1876)

Species of beetle

Stictobaris cribrata is a species of flower weevil in the beetle family Curculionidae. It is found in North America.
