= Onychobaris densa =

Scientific classification
- Domain: Eukaryota
- Kingdom: Animalia
- Phylum: Arthropoda
- Class: Insecta
- Order: Coleoptera
- Suborder: Polyphaga
- Infraorder: Cucujiformia
- Family: Curculionidae
- Genus: Onychobaris
- Species: O. densa

Binomial name
- Onychobaris densa (LeConte, 1858)

Species of beetle

Onychobaris densa is a species of flower weevil in the beetle family Curculionidae. It is found in North America.
