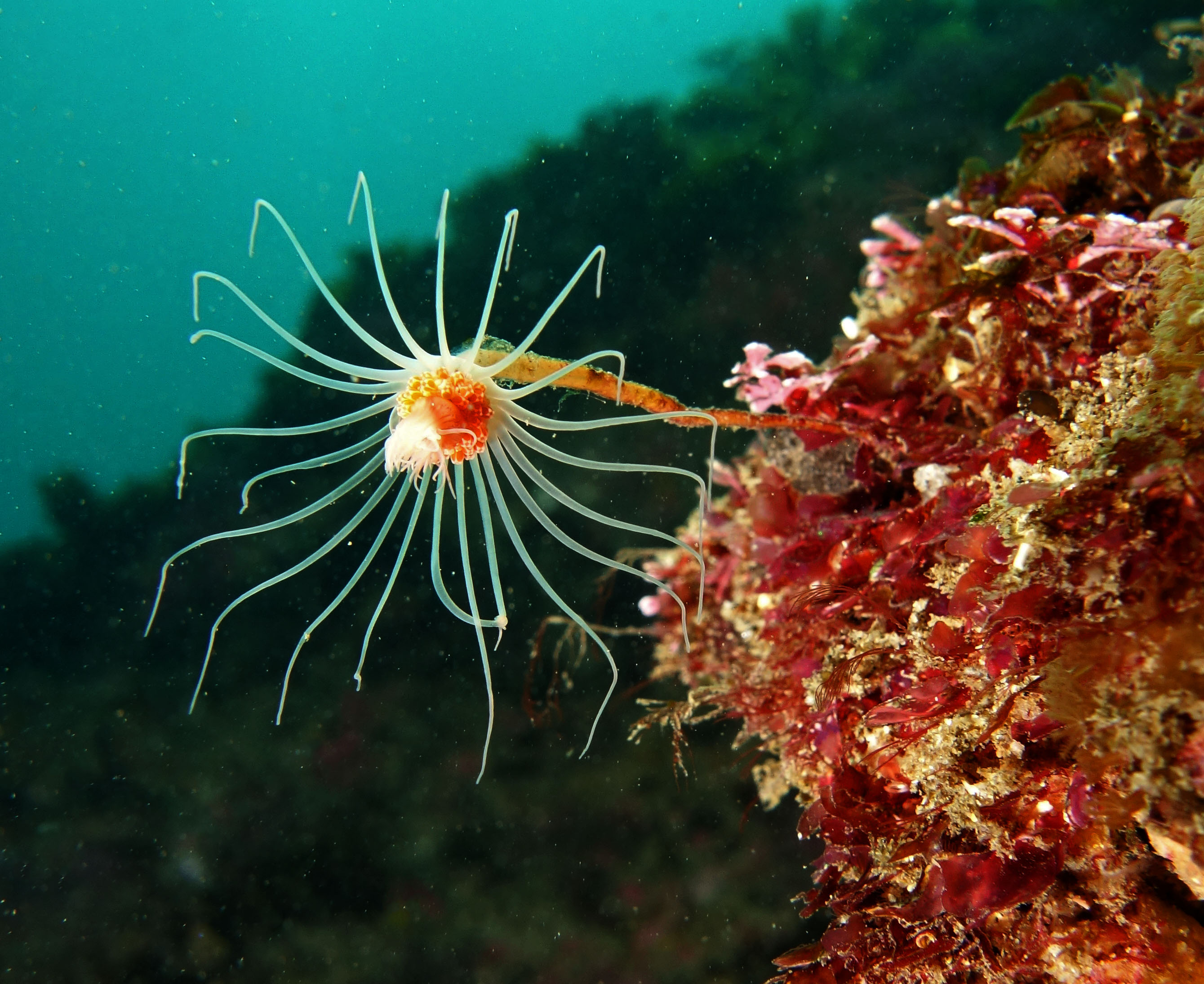
- R. magnifica at Gordon's Bay, Sidney

Scientific classification
- Domain: Eukaryota
- Kingdom: Animalia
- Phylum: Cnidaria
- Class: Hydrozoa
- Order: Anthoathecata
- Family: Tubulariidae
- Genus: Ralpharia; Watson, 1980

= Ralpharia =

Genus of hydrozoans

Ralpharia is a genus of hydrozoans belonging to the family Tubulariidae.

The species of this genus are found in Australia, Malesia and America.

Species:

- Ralpharia coccinea Watson, 1984
- Ralpharia gorgoniae Petersen, 1990
- Ralpharia magnifica Watson, 1980
- Ralpharia multitentaculata (Fraser, 1938)
- Ralpharia neira Petersen, 1990
- Ralpharia parasitica (Korotneff, 1887)
- Ralpharia rosetta Watson, 1999
- Ralpharia sanctisebastiani (Da Silveira & Migotto, 1984)
