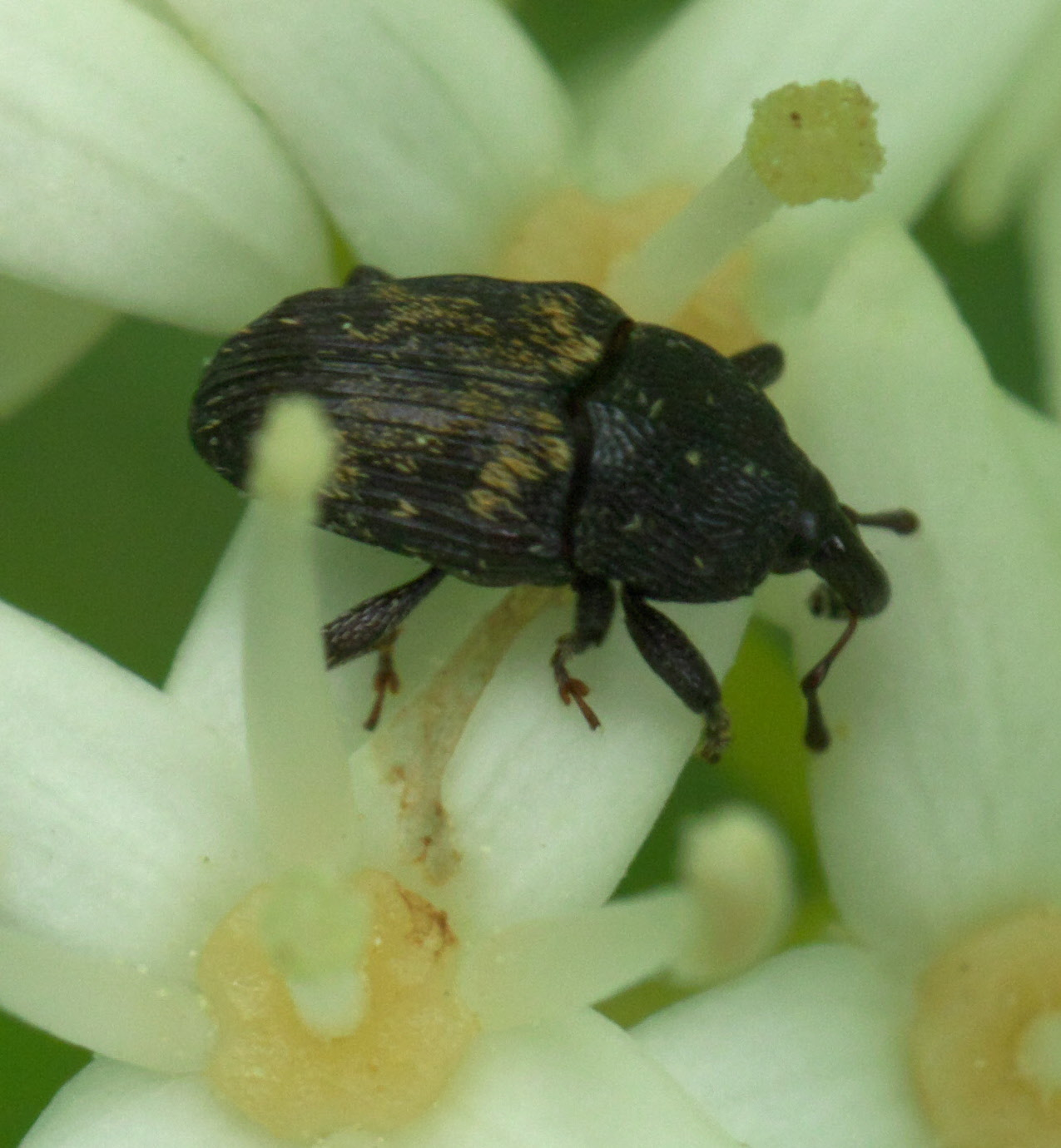

Scientific classification
- Domain: Eukaryota
- Kingdom: Animalia
- Phylum: Arthropoda
- Class: Insecta
- Order: Coleoptera
- Suborder: Polyphaga
- Infraorder: Cucujiformia
- Family: Curculionidae
- Genus: Glyptobaris
- Species: G. lecontei

Binomial name
- Glyptobaris lecontei Champion, 1909

= Glyptobaris lecontei =

Species of beetle

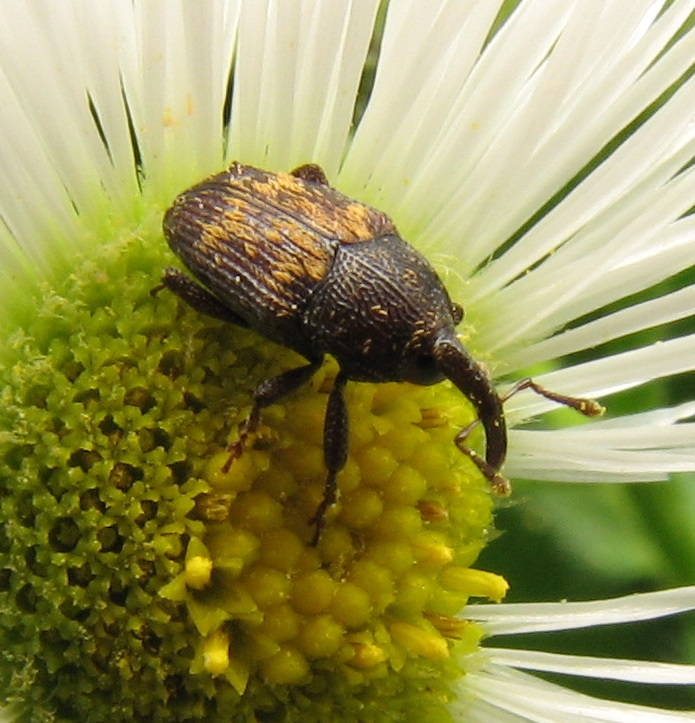
On Asteraceae flower

Glyptobaris lecontei is a species of flower weevil in the family of beetles known as Curculionidae. It is found in North America.

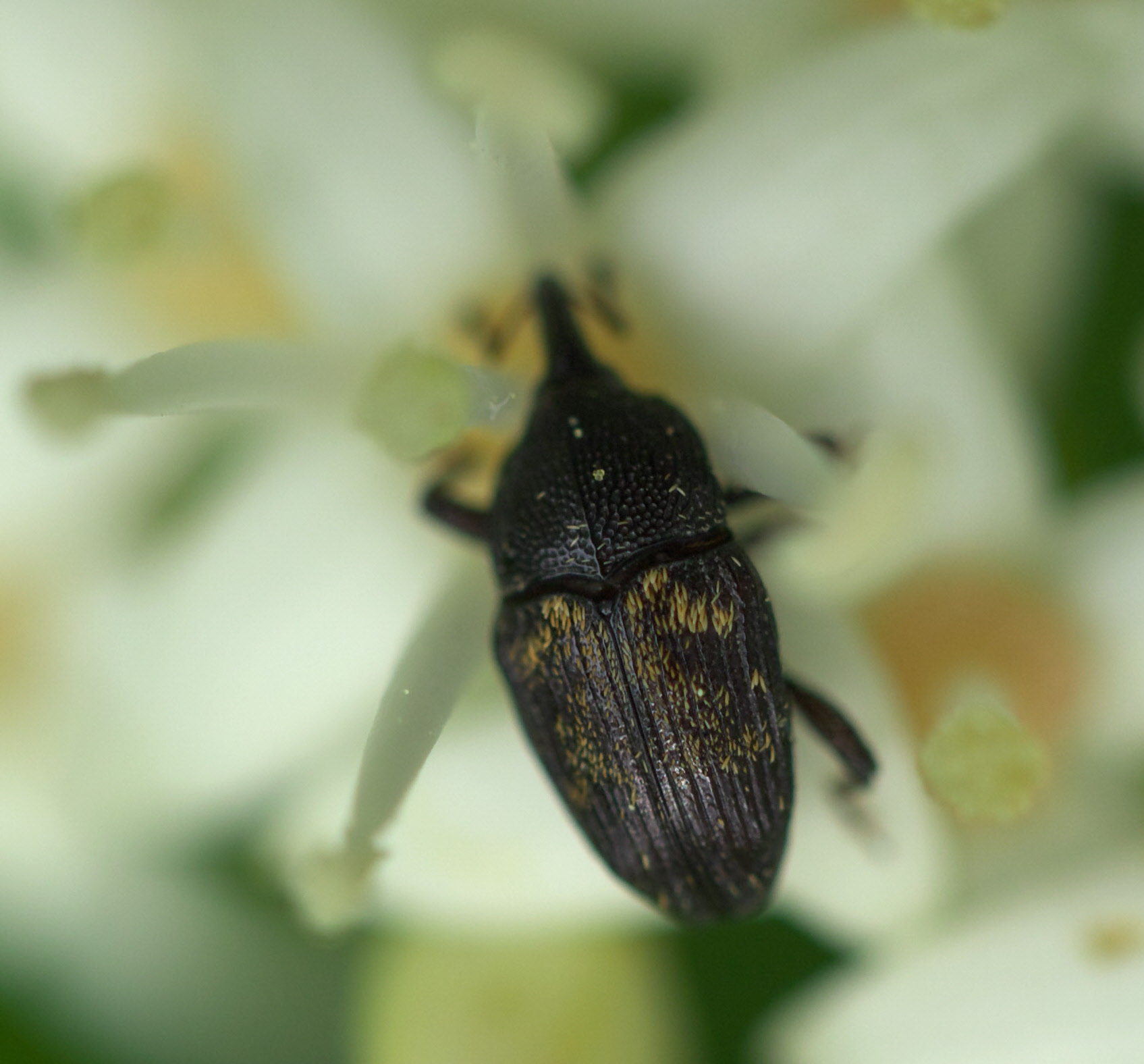
