= Stictobaris =

Scientific classification
- Domain: Eukaryota
- Kingdom: Animalia
- Phylum: Arthropoda
- Class: Insecta
- Order: Coleoptera
- Suborder: Polyphaga
- Infraorder: Cucujiformia
- Family: Curculionidae
- Tribe: Madarini
- Genus: Stictobaris; Casey, 1892

Genus of beetles

Stictobaris is a genus of flower weevils in the beetle family Curculionidae. There are about eight described species in Stictobaris.

== Species ==
These eight species belong to the genus Stictobaris:

- Stictobaris cribrata (LeConte, 1876)
- Stictobaris hirtella Hustache, A., 1924
- Stictobaris hirtellus Hustache, 1924
- Stictobaris ornatella Casey, 1920
- Stictobaris pimalis Casey, 1892
- Stictobaris primalis Casey, T.L., 1892
- Stictobaris subacuta Casey, 1892
- Stictobaris tubifera Casey, 1920
