= Gordon's Bay (Australia) =

Bay in New South Wales, Australia

Gordon's Bay Thompson's Bay
- Beach
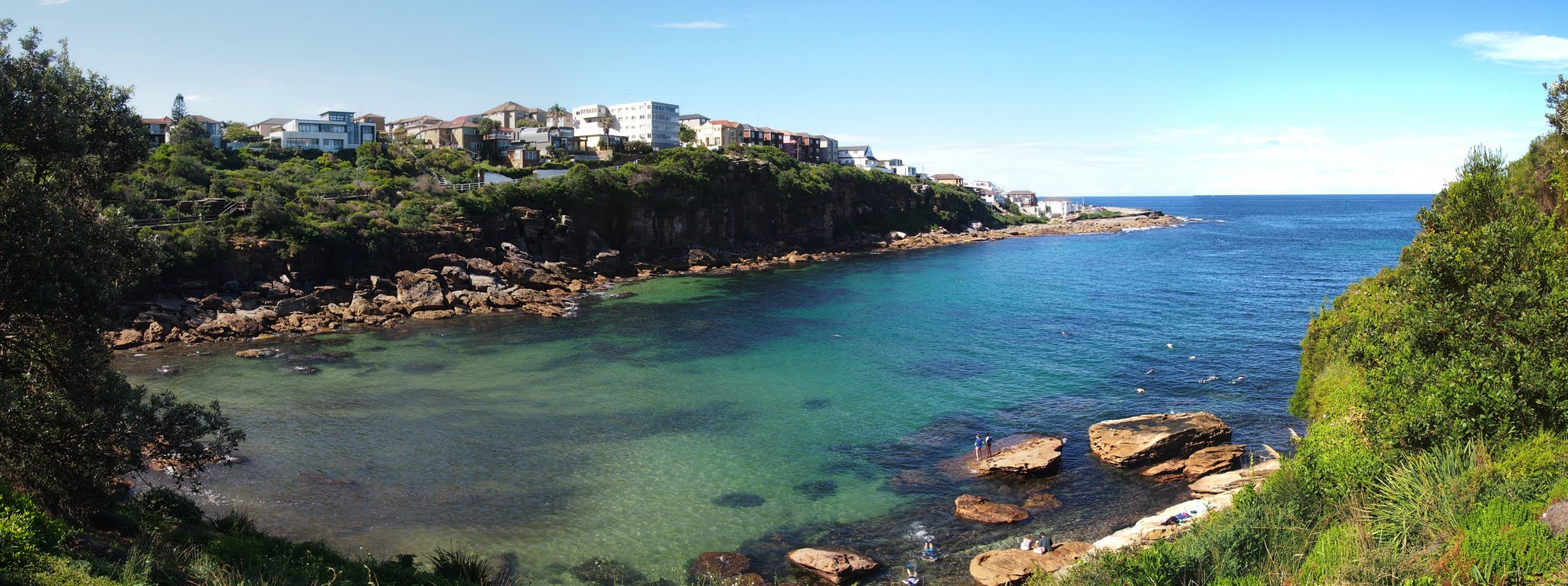

- Location within New South Wales
- Coordinates: 33°54′53.64″S 151°15′40.32″E
- Location: Randwick, New South Wales, Australia

Dimensions
  - Length: 200 m (656 ft)
- Hazard rating: 3/10 (least hazardous)

Gordon's Bay, otherwise known as Thompson's Bay, is a beach within the Eastern Suburbs of Sydney, Australia, located between Clovelly and Coogee beach. It is a site on Sydney's Coastal Walks with scenic views between two rocky headlands. The bay is renowned for various reef and coral and as a result is a popular snorkeling area with an abundance of marine life. It is also known for small aluminium dinghies with an abundance being found upon wooden racks upon the dry sand belonging to members of Gordon's Bay Amateur Fishing Club.

== Geography ==
The bay is located in between two large cliff faces with rocky outcrops on both the north and south ends. There is a small patch of sand leading from the footpath into the water and the two rocky platforms either side of the water's entry. It is only accessible through the coastal walkway linking many of Sydney's iconic Eastern Suburbs beaches. With a steep decline, the bay presents itself as a secluded area being labelled by some as a hidden oasis. On the north end, raised board walks cover the wetland undergrowth which thrives due to the conditions created by a nearby natural spring. Upon the descent of the walk, there are the wooden beams that support many boats for storage otherwise known as “tinnies” by the locals. Surrounded by many trees and shrubbery, the bay has a lot of shade often making itself a relaxing place for beach goers with an abundance of flora and fauna. The bay's water is home to many marine creatures that thrive in its calm conditions. The bay has been divided up into five distinct areas of vegetation that differentiate from each other in several ways. These are, area 1 the southern area which contains forest/scrub vegetation, area 2 the Swamp area of reeds and water, area 3 the Cleared Gordon's Bay Fishing Club Area of grass and small shrubs, area 4 the Heath Area and area 5 CliffBrook Parade with weeds and exotic species. All of these areas contain either weeds, native or exotic and each area consists of at least 5 different species of vegetation. As for fauna, the bay has one species of frog, eight reptile species, forty-two bird species with thirty-six native and six introduced as well as three introduced mammals and two native mammal species.

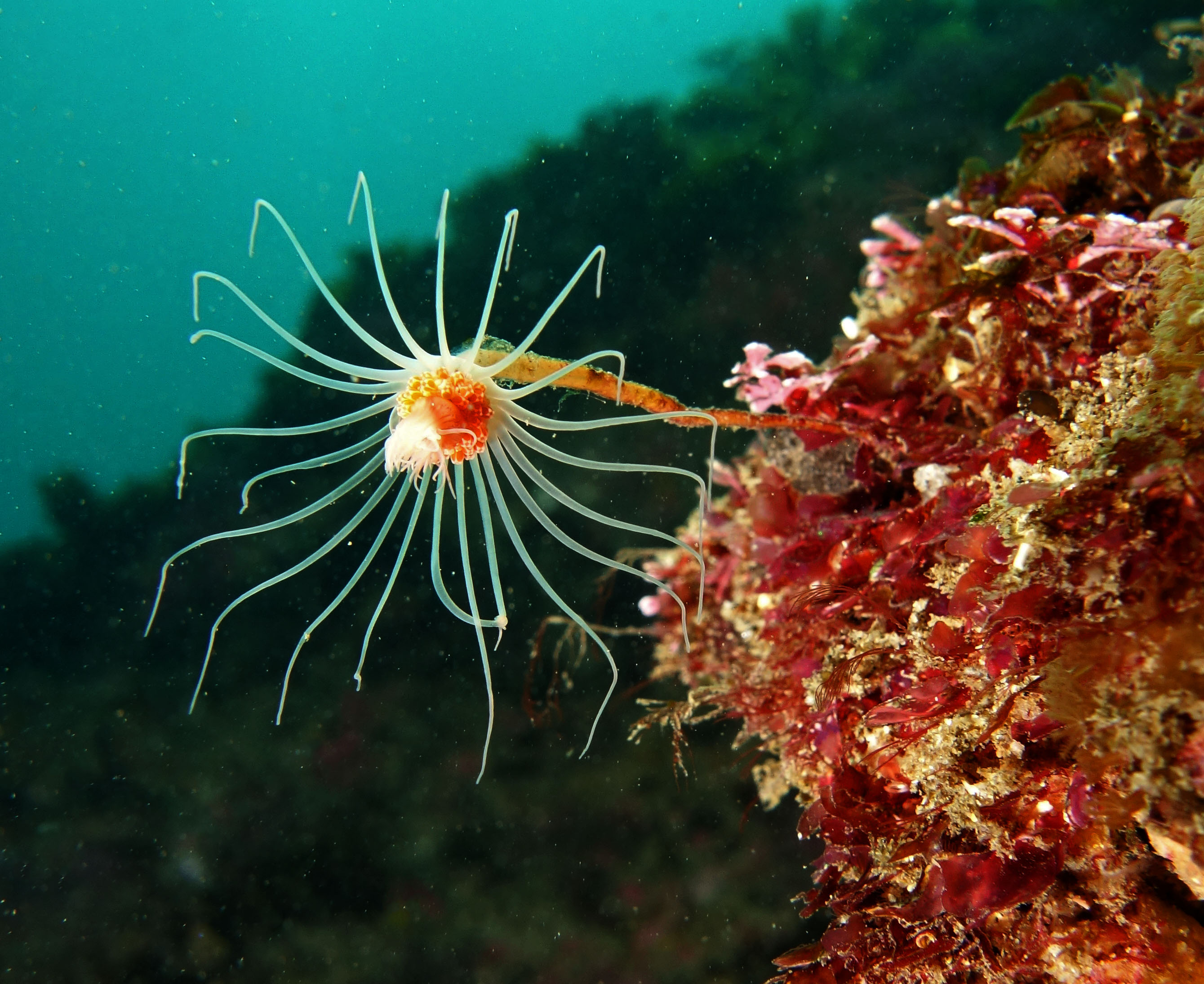
Ralpharia magnifica in the bay

Gordon's Bay underwater geography is similar to that of other oceanic communities within the Sydney beaches area. The bay's deepest point is 10 m (33 ft) containing mostly semi-mobile marine sands that are dynamic and ever-changing. There are several outcrops of reef spread out throughout the bay that are predominantly used to house kelp communities. As a result, due to the shallow nature of the beach, the bay is home for many shallow marine life species. With the prime conditions of shallow coastal waters, these kinds of fish and sea vegetation thrive in an optimal environment resulting in a diverse and vibrant array of underwater activity.

As for urban development, the bay is surrounded by a number of residential buildings, most of which consist of one, two and three storeys. There are also a number of four to five storey flats that surround the bay. This mass of housing development which presents itself within the bay is reflective of the enclosed nature of the area. The diversity of the buildings provides a conflicting image of colours that showcase a notion of randomness and lack of cohesion.

== History ==
Indigenous Australians were the first humans to occupy Gordon's Bay before colonisation from white settlers. Although there is little to no information about them connected to Gordon's Bay specifically, there is evidence for Aboriginal occupation of nearby beaches such as Bronte and Tamarama to the north. The Eastern Sydney Indigenous people otherwise known as Eora Darug participated in fishing, collecting and hunting around those two beaches making it possible the same was done at Gordon's Bay. However, due to massive disruption from white settlement with both disease, violence and attempts to assimilate Aboriginal peoples to Western culture, the indigenous population in the Eastern Suburbs has decreased significantly. The European name of Gordon's Bay was attributed in the mid 1800s to Governor Surveyor, Lewis Gordon. Using his powers as this role in the New South Wales government, he granted this land to himself until it was resold in 1859 to John Thompson an investor in the area at the time. At the time of its selling, it was renamed Cliff-Brook and amassed to 14 acres. When Thompson became Randwick's mayor in 1873, he renamed the bay again to Thompson Bay after himself and built a mansion on the northern end of the bay. Before its deconstruction in 1921, the original Cliff-Brook mansion was designed in the 1870s to be reminiscent of Victorian Italianate architecture. The building was made from sandstone, timber and brick with large verandas and was a prime example of Italian-style architecture of the period. With large gardens surrounding the mansion, horse stables and quarters for staff to the north of the property, the mansion was reminiscent of a villa, a celebration of Victorian Italianate architecture. In 1905, the property grew to be even larger with Gordon's Bay high water mark, Battery Street, Moore Street and Beach Street being attributed as land to the estate.

Currently, the reconstructed Cliff-Brook home still stands on the northern end where Sir Denison Miller the original Commonwealth Bank governor again sold the majority of the area for £3,000 to the local council. In 1976 the National Trust deemed Cliffbrook the most significant and outstanding building in the Coogee Gordon's Bay area. Despite this though, the area was demolished in order to make room for six individual plots for housing that are still standing to this day. In 1964 the local fishing club named Gordon's Bay Fishing club was formally established. After difficulty acquiring the lease for an unused boat shed on the beachfront, the club was founded for the purposes of social fishing and building a sense of community. While the building has remained mostly in shape, the structure has undergone repairs after major storms such as the one of 1974 which left damage to the walkway, rear wall and structural components of the building. Nearby the Bay there is a little boat shed constructed sometime around the early 20th century which is still in use today as a club house.

East of the boat shed are steps (down from the street) decorated with colourful mosaics. The mosaic was added, perhaps in the 70s, by local residents working at night:

In 2016 the local council added concrete pillars on the southerly side of the bay to support rock overhangs. The initial design was derided for being ugly and in 2017 they were clad with sandstone.

== Conditions ==
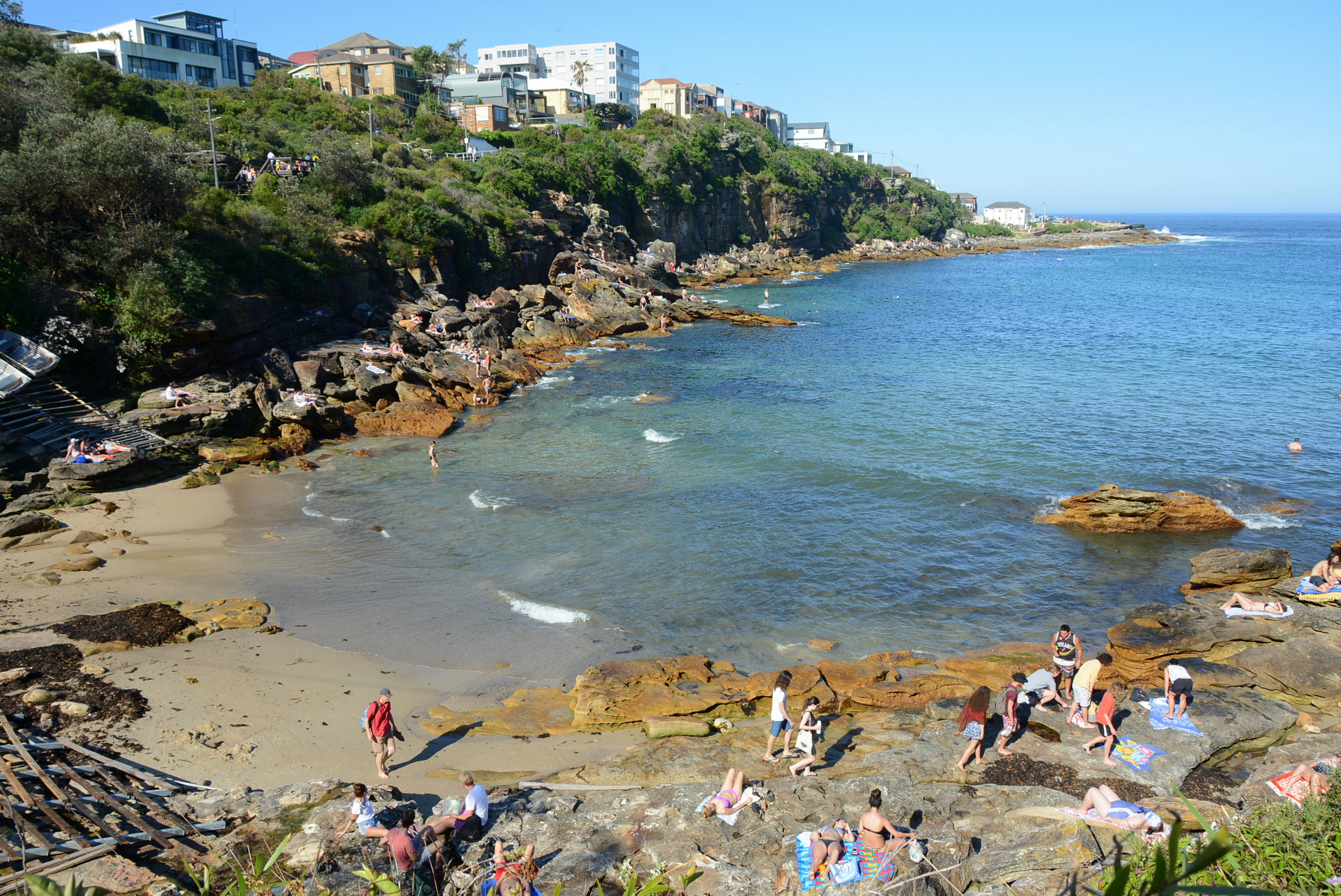
Beach goers at the bay

Gordon's Bay is not patrolled by Surf Life Saving Australia or lifeguards alike due to it having relatively calm conditions. The bay is a reflective beach positioned between two large cliff faces which allows it to be generally sheltered by storms and waves. However, 2015 was an exception, when many of the boats on the racks were destroyed due to a large storm that blew through the natural sea wall. Boats were torn apart, smashed together and crushed as the violent ocean conditions and breezes devastated the beach. A large part of the ramp made from hardwood was destroyed however the concrete clubhouse dating back to the early 20th century was unscathed. As a reflective beach, the sand and gravel exposed is steep leading into the water creating low energy waves with minimal risk to the beach goer's safety. Despite its calm and relaxing conditions for the most part, the boat storage launching function of the bay results in a significantly lower population of swimmers as opposed to its northern and southern neighbours. However, danger presents itself in a different form to most traditional beaches, with seaweed covering many rocks on both Northern and Southern ends creating slipping hazards on hard surfaces. Instead, beachgoers should not be wary of waves, tides and currents but rather other hazards. As for surfing conditions, just outside the bay to the left there is a catchable break over the rocks and on the right a rideable reef. Marine hazards of sharks and Pacific man o' war (known as blue bottles in Australia) are uncommon however are still displayed with signage. As a result, those desiring to swim are encouraged to observe the conditions and view appropriate information such as live weather feeds to be informed for their safety when they choose to enter the water.

== Fishing ==
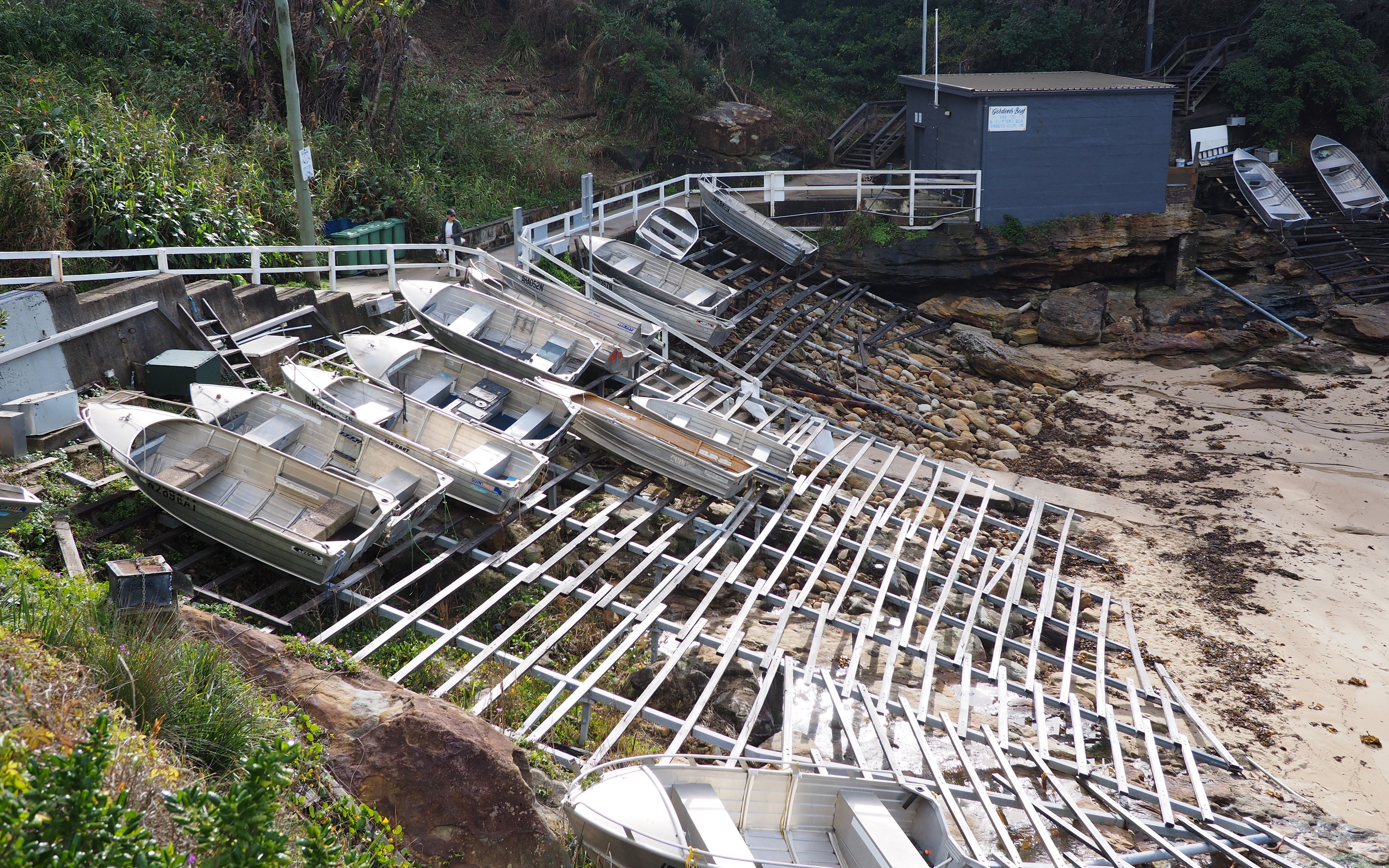
Dinghies on the bay's shore

Gordon's Bay, much like the surrounding areas is known for its abundance of marine life, with fishing boats and plentiful areas to rock fish. The Gordon's Bay fishing club is the official hub for fishing activity in the area, with many active members in the community that participate in fishing events and practices very frequently. Often fishermen are seen launching boats from the bay to begin ocean fishing or on the Southern rock face casting from the rocks. However, there are many safety issues and concerns with fishing as the Randwick coastline is renowned as a dangerous rock fishing area. Laws, such as the life jacket law, are enforced with fines to protect fishers from currents sweeping off the rocks. The bay is part of the Bronte-Coogee aquatic reserve which consists of several beaches and bays. Due to a drop off on its rocky cliff face, aquatic life is very prominent in the area with a wide range of species. It is also very accessible to patrons willing to fish with a large variety of species to catch. However, there isn't complete freedom for fishermen and fisherwomen as restrictions are in place to ensure that overfishing of endangered species does not occur. An example of one fish with protection is the blue groper (Achoerodus viridis) which is a well-renowned and sought after fish in the Eastern Suburbs. As Gordon's Bay, like all Bronte-Coogee Aquatic Reserves, is a part of the NSW recreational fishing jurisdiction and it must adhere to its rules. Line fishing is permitted but not for blue groper as mentioned previously. Spearfishing is not permitted in Gordon's Bay however collecting crustaceans is. Species such as blacklip abalone, eastern and southern rock lobsters. There are strict rules on the gathering of marine invertebrates such as sea anemones, barnacles, chitons, cockles, crabs, mussels, octopuses, oysters, pipis, sea urchins, sea stars, snails, worms and the collection of sea shells. With this in mind, it is important that those intending to fish follow the regulations for the better preservation of the bays flora and fauna.

== Tourism ==
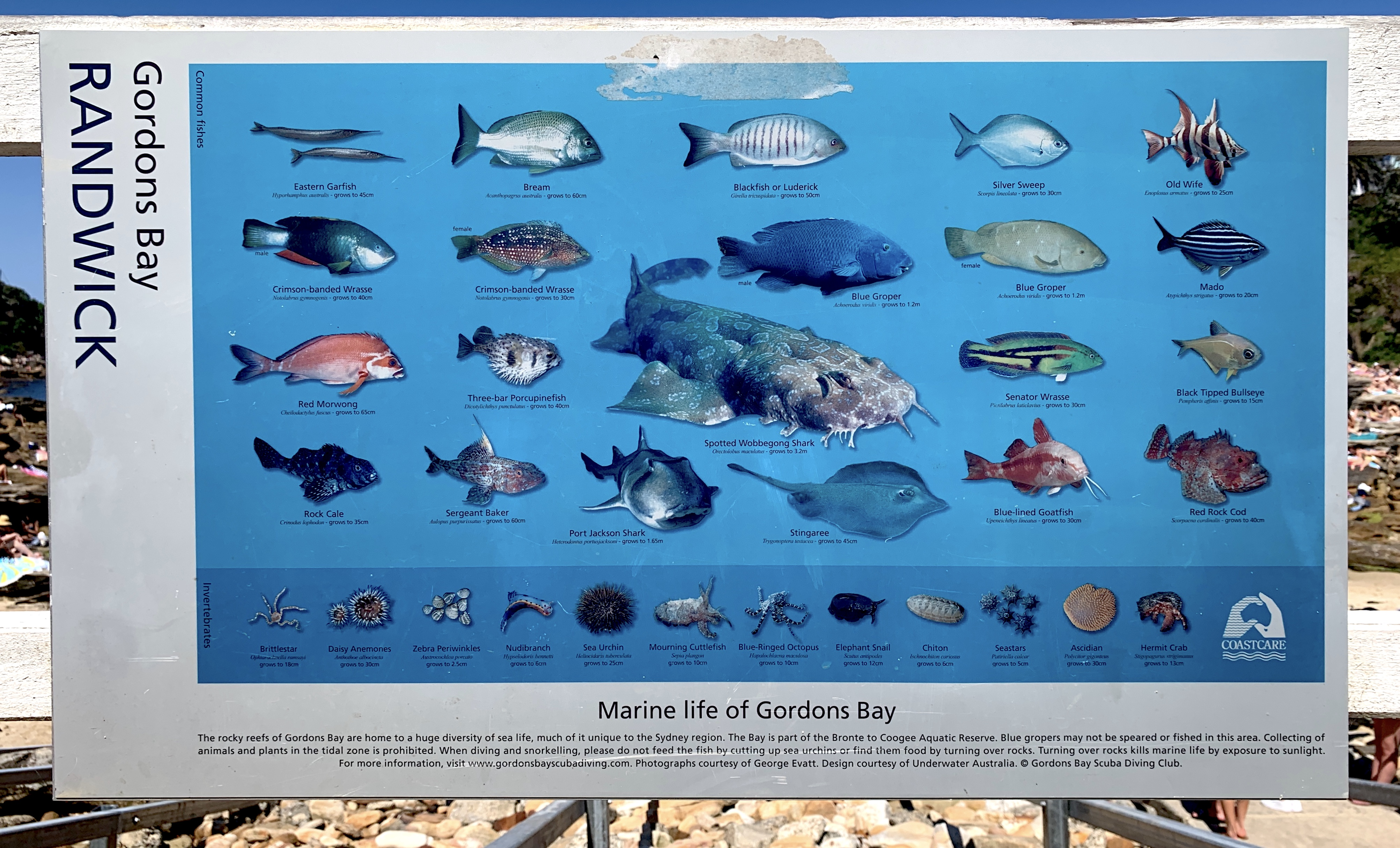
Common marine life of Gordon's Bay, Sydney

As Gordon's Bay is positioned between two of Sydney's hot spots, Clovelly and Coogee, it is with increasing popularity that people are visiting the beaches. Although it was popular as a nude beach in the 1970s, Gordon's Bay is now a place for families relax and enjoy the refreshing breezes and hot sun during Australia's summer. With many places to snorkel such as the Gordon's Bay Underwater Trail — a self-guided 45-minute journey showcasing the aquatic flora and fauna.

The Gordon's Bay Underwater Trail is a 600-meter underwater trail marked by a chain attached to drums filled with concrete placed at 20-meter intervals along the seabed. Steel plaques along the route provide information about underwater ecology and local aquatic wildlife. The deepest point is 14 meters and along the way you're likely to spot eastern footballer fish and red morwong.

Recreational activities of fishing and scuba diving with local clubs make the most of their use of the area. Being located along the coastal walk, many visitors pass by exercising through walking, jogging and recreational sightseeing. Down upon the rocks, there are many places for beach goers to sunbathe and relax, most popularly on the south end. Gordon's Bay is known to be a recreational hub within Sydney's east due to its high accessibility. The main use in the area for angling is the boat launch pads. Due to the bay being so accessible it is a popular scuba diving location for learners and novice divers with little to no experience diving. The bay is accessible by parking on the north end near Clovelly beach.
