= Onychobaris perita =

Scientific classification
- Kingdom: Animalia
- Phylum: Arthropoda
- Clade: Pancrustacea
- Class: Insecta
- Order: Coleoptera
- Suborder: Polyphaga
- Infraorder: Cucujiformia
- Superfamily: Curculionoidea
- Family: Curculionidae
- Genus: Onychobaris
- Species: O. perita

Binomial name
- Onychobaris perita Casey, 1920

Species of beetle

Onychobaris perita is a species of flower weevil in the beetle family Curculionidae. It is commonly found in North America.
