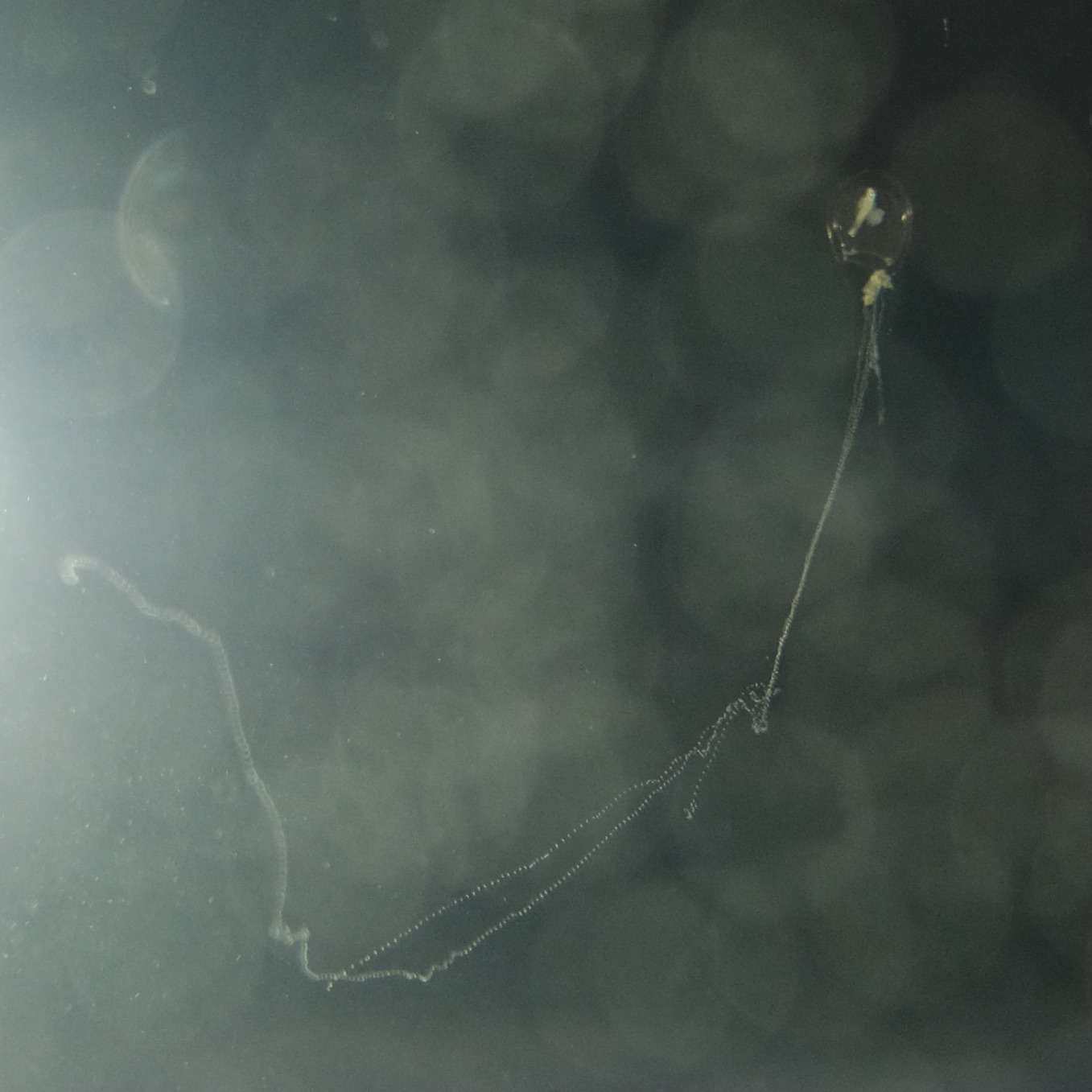
- A Hybocodon prolifer medusa.

Scientific classification
- Kingdom: Animalia
- Phylum: Cnidaria
- Class: Hydrozoa
- Order: Anthoathecata
- Family: Tubulariidae
- Genus: Hybocodon; Agassiz, 1860

= Hybocodon =

Genus of aquatic animals

Hybocodon is a genus of cnidarians belonging to the family Tubulariidae, and was first described by Louis Agassiz in 1860.

The genus has cosmopolitan distribution.

Species:

- Hybocodon apiciloculatus Xu & Huang, 2006
- Hybocodon atentaculatus Uchida, 1948
- Hybocodon chilensis Hartlaub, 1905
- Hybocodon cryptus Watson, 1984
- Hybocodon octopleurus Kao, Li & L.i.Chang, 1958
- Hybocodon prolifer Agassiz, 1860
- Hybocodon unicus (Browne, 1902)
