= The Reluctant Saint =

1962 film

- VHS cover for the film
- Directed by: Edward Dmytryk
- Screenplay by: John Fante; Joseph Petracca
- Produced by: Edward Dmytryk; John R. Sloan
- Starring: Maximilian Schell; Ricardo Montalbán; Lea Padovani; Akim Tamiroff
- Cinematography: C.M. Pennington-Richards
- Edited by: Manuel del Campo
- Music by: Nino Rota
- Production company: Dmytryk-Weiler Production
- Distributed by: Columbia Pictures (UK); Davis-Royal Films (US)
- Release dates: November 2, 1962; December 3, 1962 (US)
- Running time: 105 minutes
- Countries: Italy; United States
- Language: English

The Reluctant Saint is a 1962 American-Italian historical comedy drama film which tells the story of Joseph of Cupertino, a 17th-century Italian Conventual Franciscan friar and mystic, venerated as a saint by the Catholic Church.

It stars Maximilian Schell as Giuseppe Desa, as well as Ricardo Montalbán, Lea Padovani, Akim Tamiroff, and Harold Goldblatt. The movie was written by John Fante and Joseph Petracca and directed by Edward Dmytryk. It was made in Rome, with the sets designed by the art director, Mario Chiari.

== Plot ==
Most of the key events in the movie are based on historical events or reports about the life of Saint Joseph of Cupertino. Born Giuseppe Desa, he was said to have been remarkably unclever, but was recorded by many witnesses during his life as prone to miraculous levitation and intense ecstasies.

The film begins with Giuseppe (Maximilian Schell) spending his final days at home with his mother (Lea Padovani). Due to his slow wits, she has kept him in school despite his being a grown man, older than the other students. He is seen bearing patiently and good-heartedly the ridicule of his fellow villagers, and enduring failed attempts at work as a laborer. At the insistence of his mother, who saw no other viable alternative, he enters a Franciscan friary through the influence of his uncle Father Giovanni (Harold Goldblatt), an authority in the religious order. Trouble follows Giuseppe wherever he goes, including the friary, because he is slow. Eventually, his good heart is noticed by the visiting Bishop Durso (Akim Tamiroff), a man of similar peasant background who then orders the friars train Giuseppe for the priesthood.

Despite Giuseppe's incapacity for the necessary academic studies, and preference for tending the sheep and other animals in the friary’s stable, he is ordained a priest. Although he learns little from the tutoring of other friars like Brother Orlando (Giulio Bosetti), Giuseppe passes the necessary examinations for the priesthood through a series of unlikely or possibly miraculous events. Soon after, when Giuseppe is seen levitating in ecstatic prayer to the Blessed Virgin Mary and during the conventual Mass, one of the superiors in the community, Father Raspi (Ricardo Montalbán), accuses Giuseppe of suffering from demonic possession. Giuseppe is thus chained to the ground by his brother friars then subjected to an exorcism, but his levitations continue, persuading everyone – including his former critic Father Raspi – of the divine origins of his powers.

== Cast ==
- Maximilian Schell as Giuseppe
- Ricardo Montalbán as Father Raspi
- Lea Padovani as Giuseppe's Mother
- Akim Tamiroff as Bishop Durso
- Harold Goldblatt as Father Giovanni
- Arnoldo Foà as Felixa - Giuseppe's Father
- Carlo Croccolo as The Gobbo - the Hunchback
- Giulio Bosetti as Brother Orlando
- Elisa Cegani as Sister
- Giacomo Rossi Stuart as Young Examining Prelate
- Tonio Selwart as Examining Prelate
- Odoardo Spadaro as Old Examining Prelate

== Reception ==
A TV Guide review says: "A light-hearted tone is kept throughout, but the stereotyped performances, unbelievable settings, and lifeless direction hurt whatever promises are inherent in the material". Other more favorable reviews can be found at IMDB.com, as well as decentfilms.com.
