= Madarellus inconstans =

Scientific classification
- Domain: Eukaryota
- Kingdom: Animalia
- Phylum: Arthropoda
- Class: Insecta
- Order: Coleoptera
- Suborder: Polyphaga
- Infraorder: Cucujiformia
- Family: Curculionidae
- Genus: Madarellus
- Species: M. inconstans

Binomial name
- Madarellus inconstans Casey, 1920

Species of beetle

Madarellus inconstans is a species of flower weevil in the beetle family Curculionidae. It is found in North America.
