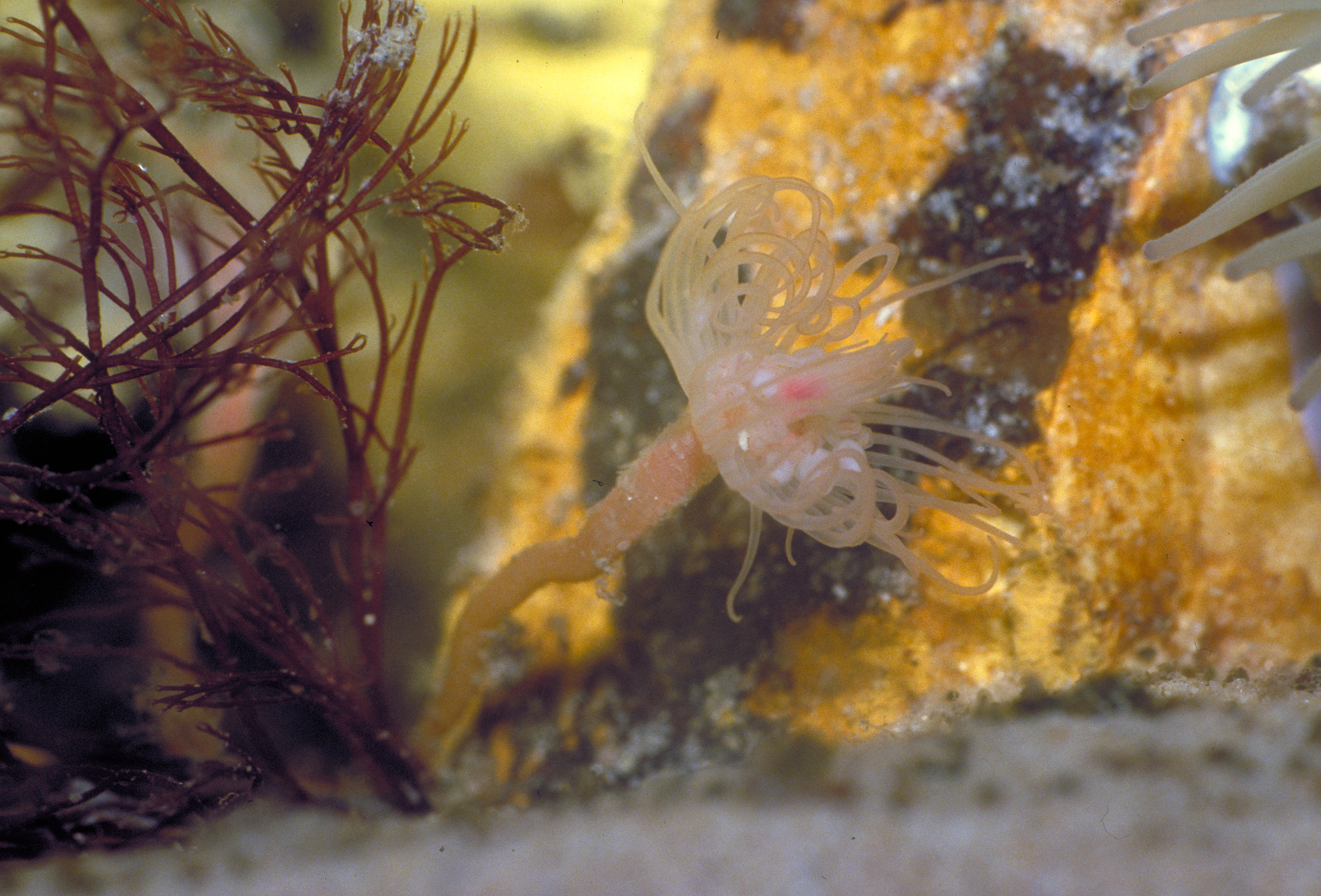
- Ectopleura larynx

Scientific classification
- Kingdom: Animalia
- Phylum: Cnidaria
- Class: Hydrozoa
- Order: Anthoathecata
- Family: Tubulariidae
- Genus: Ectopleura
- Species: E. larynx

Binomial name
- Ectopleura larynx Ellis & Solander, 1786

Synonyms
- Tubularia larynx

= Ectopleura larynx =

Species of hydrozoan

Ectopleura larynx, or the ringed tubularia, is a species of hydroid in the family Tubulariidae.

== Description ==
Ectopleura larynx forms colonies usually no more than 6 centimetres (2 1/2 inches) high. The stems are tubular, with a yellowish integument, and are branched at the base. The polyps range in colour from pale pink to red, and consist of a central circlet of oral tentacles surrounded by larger, paler aboral tentacles.

== Distribution and habitat ==
E. larynx is found throughout the British Isles and the North Atlantic Ocean.

It typically grows on rocks or attached to algae, and is most common in shallow waters, where it may foul piers and the undersides of boats. It forms colonies and can tolerate exposed habitats and strong water currents.
