= Aaadonta pelewana =

Conservation status
- Critically Endangered (IUCN 3.1)

Scientific classification
- Kingdom: Animalia
- Phylum: Mollusca
- Class: Gastropoda
- Order: Stylommatophora
- Family: Endodontidae
- Genus: Aaadonta
- Species: A. pelewana

Binomial name
- Aaadonta pelewana Solem, 1976

Species of gastropod

Aaadonta pelewana is a species of snail, a terrestrial pulmonate gastropod mollusk in the family Endodontidae. It is found in Palau, where it was known from Peleliu and Koror. If it is still extant, it is threatened by the destruction and modification of its tropical moist lowland forest habitat.
