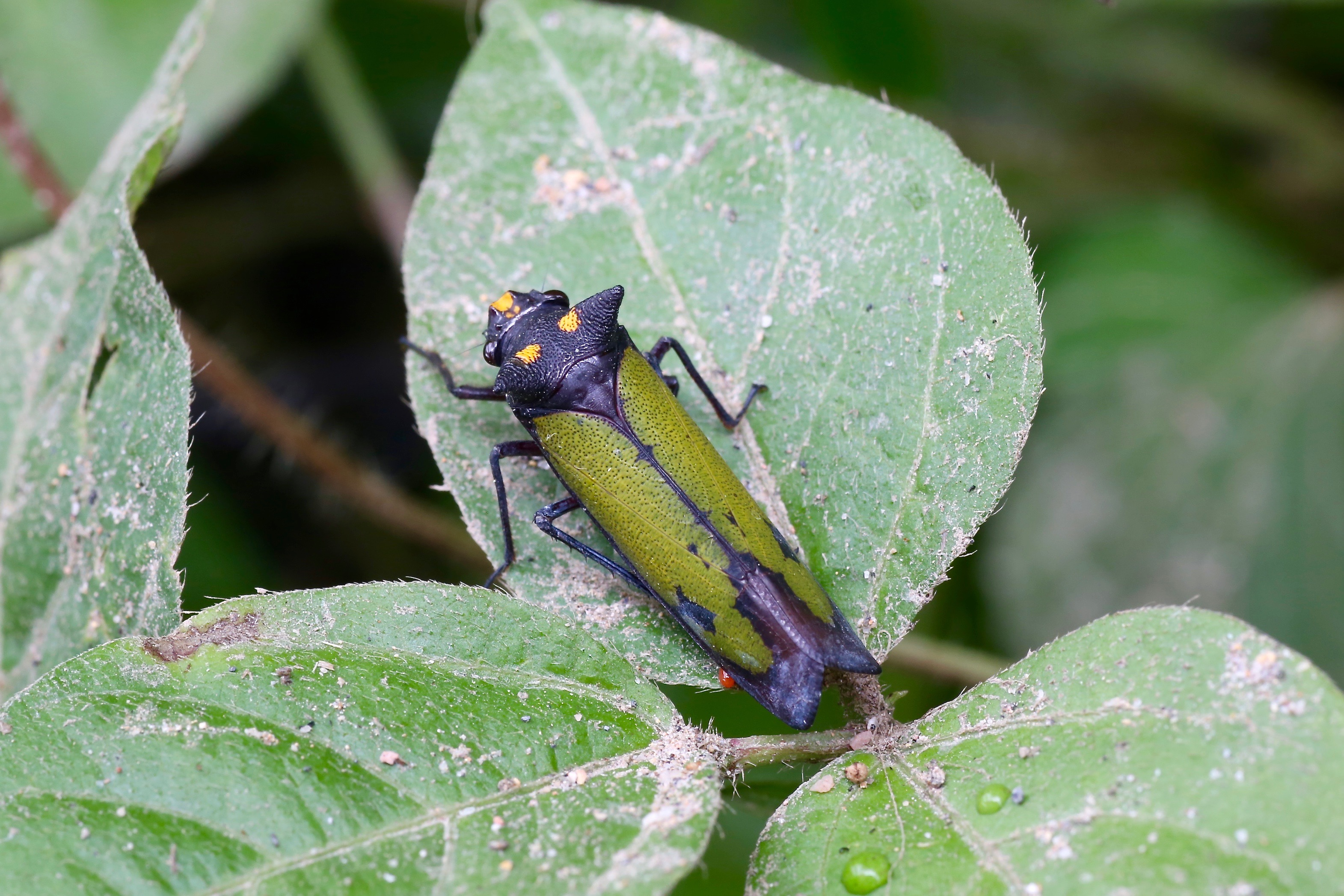
- Zyzzogeton viridipennis

Scientific classification
- Domain: Eukaryota
- Kingdom: Animalia
- Phylum: Arthropoda
- Class: Insecta
- Order: Hemiptera
- Suborder: Auchenorrhyncha
- Family: Cicadellidae
- Tribe: Proconiini
- Genus: Zyzzogeton; Breddin, 1902

Synonyms
- Williamsiana Goding, 1926; Zyzzogedon Metcalf, 1965 (Missp.)

= Zyzzogeton =

Genus of leafhoppers

Zyzzogeton is a rare genus of leafhoppers endemic to South America. It is named after a former genus Zyzza (probably an onomatopoeia), appended with the ancient Greek geitōn (γείτων 'neighbour').

The word is known for being the last word defined in the Webster's New International Dictionary, Unabridged released in September 1961. It also appears in the 1939 Second edition, and is still present in current versions.

== Species ==
- Zyzzogeton haenschi Breddin, 1902
- Zyzzogeton quadrimaculata Nielson & Godoy, 1995
- Zyzzogeton viridipennis (Latreille, 1809)

== See also ==
- Zyzzyva, a weevil, another "last entry"
