= Zzyzx =

Zzyzx or Zyzzyx may refer to:

== Places ==
- Zzyzx, California, a place in the U.S., and Zzyzx Road, a road leading to it

== Arts and entertainment ==
- Zyzzyx Road, a 2006 film directed by John Penney
- Zzyzx (Zeromancer album), 2003
- Zzyzx (Os Mutantes album), 2020
- Zzyzx (film), a 2006 film directed by Richard Halpern
- "Zzyzx Rd." (song), a 2007 song by Stone Sour from Come What(ever) May
- Zzyzx, a fictional underground research facility in the TV series Kyle XY
- Zzyzx, a fictional prison for demons in the novel series Fablehaven by Brandon Mull

== Other uses ==
- Zyzzyx, a genus of sand wasp

== See also ==
- Xyzzy (disambiguation)
- "Zzyzx Scarecrow", a song by Stavesacre from the 1997 album Absolutes
- Zyzyxia, a species of tropical shrub
- Zyzz, the persona that was used by Australian bodybuilder Aziz Shavershian
- Zzyzzyxx, a 1982 arcade game
- Captain Zzyzx, a novel by Michael Petracca
