= Onychobaris =

Scientific classification
- Kingdom: Animalia
- Phylum: Arthropoda
- Class: Insecta
- Order: Coleoptera
- Suborder: Polyphaga
- Infraorder: Cucujiformia
- Family: Curculionidae
- Tribe: Madarini
- Genus: Onychobaris; LeConte, 1876

Genus of beetles

Onychobaris is a genus of flower weevils in the beetle family Curculionidae. There are more than 40 described species in Onychobaris.

== Species ==
These 48 species belong to the genus Onychobaris:

- Onychobaris alutacea Hustache, 1951
- Onychobaris amazonica Casey, 1922
- Onychobaris ambigua Casey, 1892
- Onychobaris arguta Casey, 1892
- Onychobaris armipes Solari & F., 1906
- Onychobaris audax Casey, 1892
- Onychobaris austera Casey, 1892
- Onychobaris cernua Casey, 1920
- Onychobaris chihuahuae Casey, 1920
- Onychobaris corrosa Casey, 1892
- Onychobaris cribrata LeConte & J.L., 1876
- Onychobaris densa (LeConte, 1858)
- Onychobaris dentitibia Solari & F., 1906
- Onychobaris depressa Casey, 1892
- Onychobaris diluta Casey, 1892
- Onychobaris distans (LeConte, 1868)
- Onychobaris egena Casey, 1892
- Onychobaris fulvescens Hustache, 1924
- Onychobaris ilex Casey, 1892
- Onychobaris illex Casey & T.L., 1892
- Onychobaris implicata Casey, 1920
- Onychobaris insidiosa Casey, 1892
- Onychobaris langei Van Dyke, 1951
- Onychobaris liberta Casey, 1920
- Onychobaris mansueta Casey, 1920
- Onychobaris mentorea Casey, 1920
- Onychobaris metuens Casey, 1920
- Onychobaris millepora Casey, 1892
- Onychobaris molesta Casey, 1892
- Onychobaris mustica Casey
- Onychobaris mystica Casey, 1892
- Onychobaris nicaraguensis Solari & F., 1906
- Onychobaris oblita Casey, 1920
- Onychobaris pauperella Casey, 1892
- Onychobaris pectorosa LeConte, 1876
- Onychobaris perita Casey, 1920
- Onychobaris perversa Casey, 1920
- Onychobaris pollens Casey, 1920
- Onychobaris porcata Casey, 1892
- Onychobaris punctatissima Solari & F., 1906
- Onychobaris remota Casey, 1892
- Onychobaris rufa Linell, 1897
- Onychobaris rugicollis LeConte & J.L., 1876
- Onychobaris senecta Champion & G.C., 1909
- Onychobaris seriata (LeConte, 1857)
- Onychobaris stictica Casey, 1892
- Onychobaris subtonsa LeConte, 1876
- Onychobaris veterator Casey, 1920
