= Madarellus cuneatus =

Scientific classification
- Domain: Eukaryota
- Kingdom: Animalia
- Phylum: Arthropoda
- Class: Insecta
- Order: Coleoptera
- Suborder: Polyphaga
- Infraorder: Cucujiformia
- Family: Curculionidae
- Genus: Madarellus
- Species: M. cuneatus

Binomial name
- Madarellus cuneatus Casey, 1893

Synonyms
- Madarellus caseyi Solari and Solari, 1906

Species of beetle

Madarellus cuneatus is a species of flower weevil in the family Curculionidae. It is found in North America. It lives in the stems of Vitis vines.
