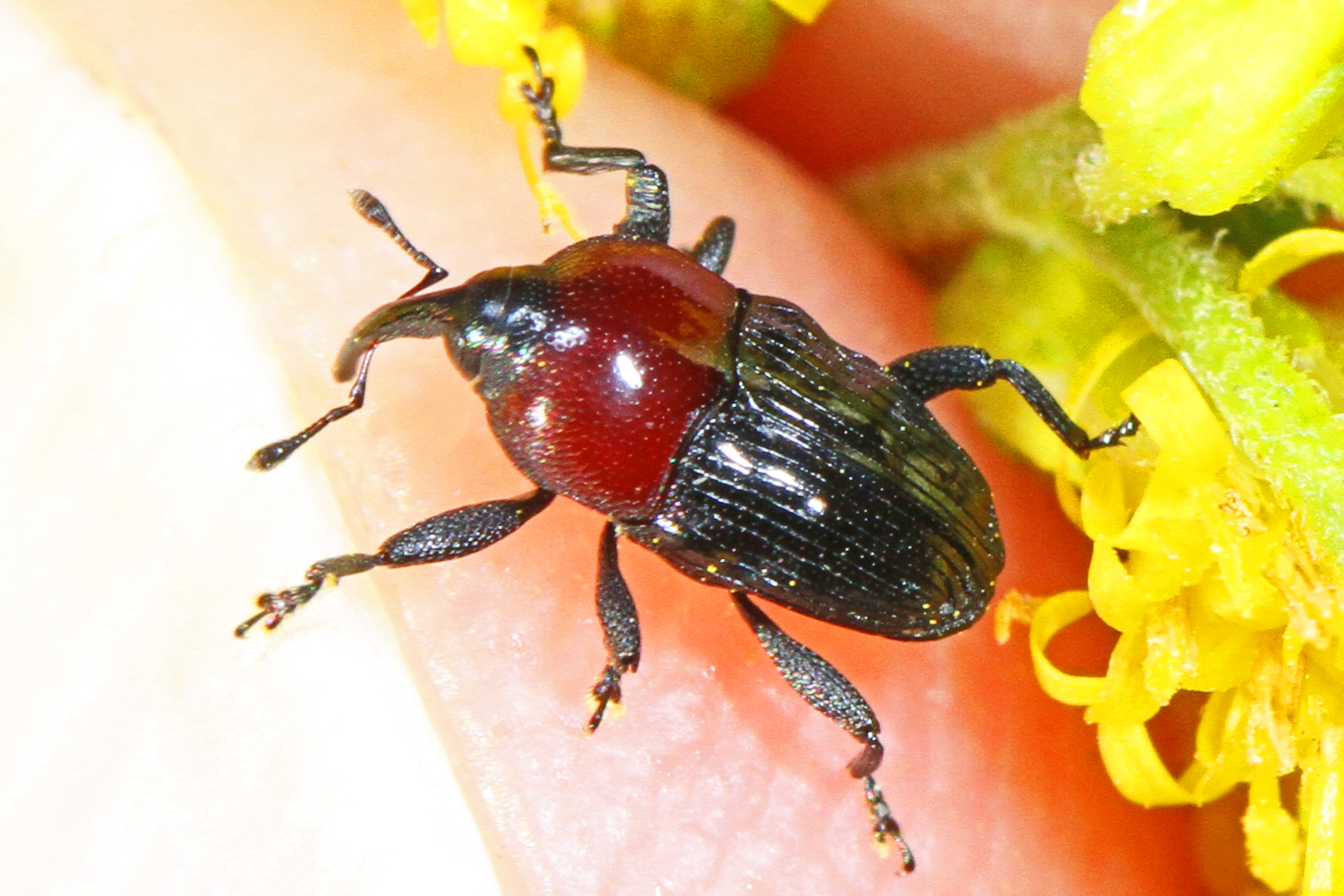

Scientific classification
- Kingdom: Animalia
- Phylum: Arthropoda
- Class: Insecta
- Order: Coleoptera
- Suborder: Polyphaga
- Infraorder: Cucujiformia
- Family: Curculionidae
- Genus: Madarellus
- Species: M. undulatus

Binomial name
- Madarellus undulatus (Say, 1824)

= Madarellus undulatus =

Species of beetle

Madarellus undulatus is a species of weevils belonging to the Baridinae subfamily. It is 2.8–4.5 millimetres (0.11–0.18 in) long and have brown coloured head and black or sometimes reddish body. The prothorax is glossy and somewhat punctate with striate elytron. M. undulatus can be found in both Canada (Ontario and Quebec) and in the United States. Larvae feed on poison ivy and Parthenocissus quinquefolia.
