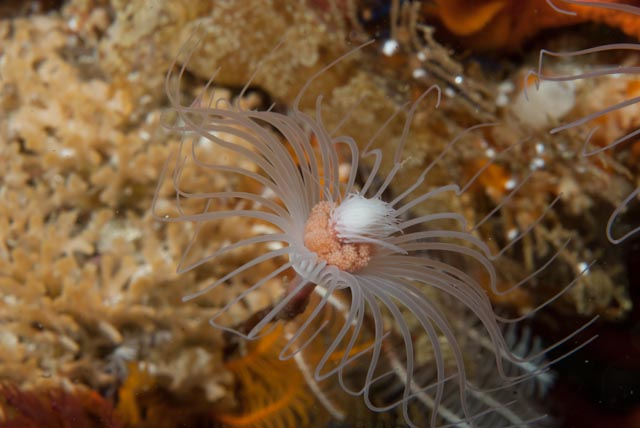

Scientific classification
- Kingdom: Animalia
- Phylum: Cnidaria
- Class: Hydrozoa
- Order: Anthoathecata
- Family: Tubulariidae
- Genus: Ectopleura
- Species: E. crocea

Binomial name
- Ectopleura crocea (Agassiz, 1862)

= Ectopleura crocea =

Species of cnidarian

Ectopleura crocea, the tubular hydroid or pink-mouth hydroid, is a species of hydroid cnidarian, and is found in temperate coastal waters. It is a member of the family Tubulariidae.

== Description ==
Ectopleura crocea resembles a long-stemmed narrow-petalled flower. The stem is encased in a sheath. The polyps are pink or orange and white, with an outer ring of long tentacles. There are short tentacles surrounding the mouth rising from a cluster of yellow bead-like bunches of reproductive sporosacs.

== Distribution ==
This species is native to the Atlantic coast of North America, and also occurs in the Mediterranean Sea, the northeastern Atlantic Ocean, South Africa, Australia, New Zealand, and the west coast of North America.

== Ecology ==
Male and female sporosacs are on separate hydranths (feeding individuals) in the colony. These animals feed on tiny planktonic crustaceans.
