= Madarellus =

Scientific classification
- Domain: Eukaryota
- Kingdom: Animalia
- Phylum: Arthropoda
- Class: Insecta
- Order: Coleoptera
- Suborder: Polyphaga
- Infraorder: Cucujiformia
- Family: Curculionidae
- Genus: Madarellus; Casey, 1892

Genus of beetles

Madarellus is a genus of flower weevils in the family Curculionidae. There are at least 50 described species in Madarellus.

== Species ==
These 52 species belong to the genus Madarellus:

- Madarellus albofasciatus Solari, F., 1906
- Madarellus albonotatus Solari, F., 1906
- Madarellus alticollis Hustache, 1940
- Madarellus amazonicus Casey, 1922
- Madarellus amnicola Casey, 1922
- Madarellus balteatus Casey, 1922
- Madarellus caseyi Solari, F., 1906
- Madarellus castaneus Hustache, 1951
- Madarellus chapadanus Casey, 1922
- Madarellus claveri Hustache, 1951
- Madarellus cuneatus Casey, 1893
- Madarellus cuneipennis Hustache, 1951
- Madarellus denieri Hustache, 1951
- Madarellus dilutus Champion, G.C., 1908
- Madarellus ebenus Hustache, A., 1938
- Madarellus eruptus Champion, G.C., 1908
- Madarellus fasciata Hustache, A., 1938
- Madarellus fausti Solari, F., 1906
- Madarellus floridanus Casey, 1920
- Madarellus gibbicollis Casey, T.L., 1920
- Madarellus hondurasensis Casey, 1920
- Madarellus impar Casey, 1920
- Madarellus impressus Champion, G.C., 19098
- Madarellus imulus Casey, 1920
- Madarellus inaequalis Champion, G.C., 1908
- Madarellus inanis Lacordaire, T. in Dejean, P.F.M.A.,
- Madarellus inconstans Casey, 1920
- Madarellus jalapanus Champion, G.C., 1908
- Madarellus laevicollis Champion, G.C., 1908
- Madarellus laticollis Hustache, A., 1938
- Madarellus maculatus Solari, F., 1906
- Madarellus mexicanus Solari, F., 1906
- Madarellus oblongulus Casey, 1922
- Madarellus perditus Casey, 1920
- Madarellus punctatus Fall, H.C., 1909
- Madarellus puniceicollis Champion, G.C., 1908
- Madarellus quadriguttatus Champion, G.C., 1908
- Madarellus rufescens Solari, F., 1906
- Madarellus ruficollis Solari, F., 1906
- Madarellus rufomaculatus Champion, G.C., 1908
- Madarellus rufopiceus Casey, 1922
- Madarellus sanguinosus Faust, J., 1896
- Madarellus sangunicollis Hustache, 1951
- Madarellus seminitidus Hustache, 1940
- Madarellus seriatus Casey, 1922
- Madarellus singularis Hustache, A., 1938
- Madarellus sordidus Casey, T.L., 1922
- Madarellus sortitus Casey, 1922
- Madarellus striatulus Champion, G.C., 1908
- Madarellus truncatidens Casey, 1922
- Madarellus undulatus (Say, 1824)
- Madarellus vinaceus Hustache, 1951
