= Joseph Petracca =

American novelist

Joseph Petracca (December 16, 1913 – September 28, 1963) was an American novelist, short story writer, screenwriter, and television writer of Italian descent. Born and raised in Brooklyn, New York, Petracca moved to Los Angeles after the end of World War II (during which time he worked as a machinist in the Brooklyn Navy Yard) and worked a series of full-time jobs, mainly as a steam press operator for a laundry and linen rental service, while he pursued his writing in the evenings and began raising a family with his wife Lena. In the early fifties Petracca began publishing fiction in the popular magazines of the day. Throughout the fifties Petracca wrote and collaborated on numerous films for such studios as 20th Century Fox and Paramount Pictures and in the sixties wrote episodes for such television shows as The Untouchables, Rawhide and Route 66 (TV series). Petracca is survived by a daughter, Frances Petracca, a neuroscientist and AIDS researcher, and a son, novelist and university Lecturer Emeritus Michael Petracca.

== Fiction ==
Petracca had early success as a writer of short stories for magazines such as Collier's Weekly and The Saturday Evening Post. Many of his stories featured a fictional Italian-American family, the Espositos, loosely based upon Petracca's own family. Narrated by one of the Esposito children, Joey, these stories centered on themes of poverty, cultural alienation, and the joyful resiliency of family. Petracca used this same fictional family as the centerpiece for his first novel, Come Back to Sorrento, published by Little, Brown and Company in the United States, and Victor Gollancz in London, in 1953. He wrote one time travel story "Tolliver's Travels" with Frank Fenton in the first major anthology of original science fiction, New Tales of Space and Time, Raymond J. Healy editor, 1951 Henry Holt.

== Film ==
One of Petracca's short prose pieces, "Something For the Birds," - a proto-environmentalist comedy focusing on the plight of the California condor - was purchased by 20th Century Fox studios in the same year as the release of Come Back to Sorrento, and Petracca co-authored the screenplay with Alvin M. Josephy . The film version of "Something for the Birds" was directed by Robert Wise. Petracca was subsequently hired by Fox studios as a contract writer and for the next several years wrote and collaborated on numerous screenplays, including Seven Cities of Gold (1955) and The Proud Ones (1956). Subsequent to his tenure at Fox, Petracca continued writing and collaborating on screenplays through the end of the fifties, with such titles as The Jayhawkers! (1959) and The Proud Rebel (1958), starring Alan Ladd, Olivia de Havilland, Dean Jagger and John Carradine, and directed by Michael Curtiz.

In the sixties, Petracca turned mainly to writing for television, although he did collaborate with novelist and long-time friend John Fante on a motion picture, The Reluctant Saint (1962), based upon the story of 17th century Saint Joseph of Cupertino, who, according to legend, had the gift of levitation (paranormal). That film starred Maximilian Schell in the title role and was directed by Edward Dmytryk.

== Television ==
Prior to his death from cancer in 1963, Petracca wrote or collaborated on such television projects as Alcoa Presents: One Step Beyond (1960), seven episodes of The Untouchables, (1959–1961), The Asphalt Jungle (1961), Route 66, Sam Benedict (1962), Rawhide (1962–1963), and The Richard Boone Show (1963).
