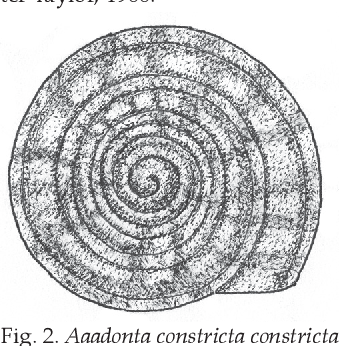

Conservation status
- Endangered (IUCN 3.1)

Scientific classification
- Kingdom: Animalia
- Phylum: Mollusca
- Class: Gastropoda
- Order: Stylommatophora
- Family: Endodontidae
- Genus: Aaadonta
- Species: A. constricta

Binomial name
- Aaadonta constricta (Semper, 1874)

Subspecies
- A. c. babelthuapi; A. c. constricta; A. c. constricta

Synonyms
- Edodonta constricta Semper, 1874

= Aaadonta constricta =

Species of gastropod

Aaadonta constricta is a species of land snail, a terrestrial pulmonate gastropod mollusk in the family Endodontidae. It is endemic to Palau, where it is known from the islands of Babeldaob, Ngemelis, Peleliu and Koror. It may be extirpated from Koror. It is threatened by habitat destruction and modification. This species plays an important role in the ecosystem by eating decaying plants and fungi they help return nutrients back to the soil. In 1976, Solem described two subspecies of Aaadonta constricta:

- A. c. babelthuapi
- A. c. constricta
- A. c. komakanensis
