= Michael Petracca =

American novelist

Michael Petracca is an American novelist, Lecturer Emeritus and former Acting Co-director of the Writing Program at the University of California, Santa Barbara.

Petracca is the son of screenwriter Joseph Petracca, and grew up in Southern California. After studying music, art, and the French language at the University of California, Los Angeles, he did graduate work at the University of California, Santa Barbara in the early 1970s, completing a master's degree there in 1972. As well as teaching writing, Petracca has also worked as a prison counselor, and has played guitar for musical groups J. T. and the Zydeco Zippers, Bunnyhead, Bossa Blue, Montecito Jazz Project and Cosmic Love Child.

Petracca's two novels, Doctor Syntax and Captain Zzyzx, published by Capra Press, feature Harmon Nails III as a protagonist. In Doctor Syntax (set in the Los Angeles area), Nails is a graduate student struggling to finish his dissertation. In Captain Zzyzx (set in the fictional "Fiesta City", in Southern California), Nails has rejected academia and plays in a rhythm and blues band while searching for love.

In recent years Petracca's writing has focused on popular culture criticism and creative nonfiction, the latter relating volunteers' contributions in the areas of habitat conservation and hospice care.

== Bibliography ==
- Doctor Syntax (1989)
- Captain Zzyzx (1992)
- The Graceful Lie: A Method for Making Fiction (1999)
- Academic Communities/Disciplinary Conventions (with Bonnie Beedles) (2001)
- Reading Popular Culture (with Madeleine Sorapure) (2012)
- Common Culture: Reading and Writing About American Popular Culture (with Madeleine Sorapure) (1994, 1997, 2000, 2003, 2006, 2009, 2013)
