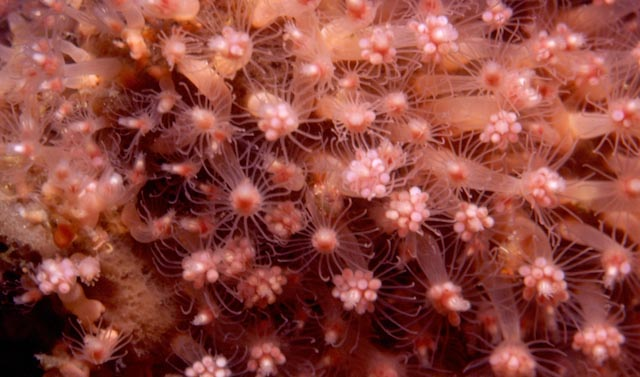
- Zyzzyzus warreni

Scientific classification
- Kingdom: Animalia
- Phylum: Cnidaria
- Class: Hydrozoa
- Order: Anthoathecata
- Family: Tubulariidae
- Genus: Zyzzyzus; Stechow, 1921

= Zyzzyzus =

Genus of cnidarians

Zyzzyzus is a genus of marine tubulariid hydrozoans, which grow embedded in sponges.

== Species ==
- Zyzzyzus floridanus Petersen, 1990
- Zyzzyzus iyoensis (Yamada, 1959)
- Zyzzyzus parvula (Hickson & Gravely, 1907)
- Zyzzyzus robustus Petersen, 1990
- Zyzzyzus rubusidaeus Brinckmann-Voss & Calder, 2013
- Zyzzyzus spongicolus (von Lendenfeld, 1884)
- Zyzzyzus warreni Calder, 1988
