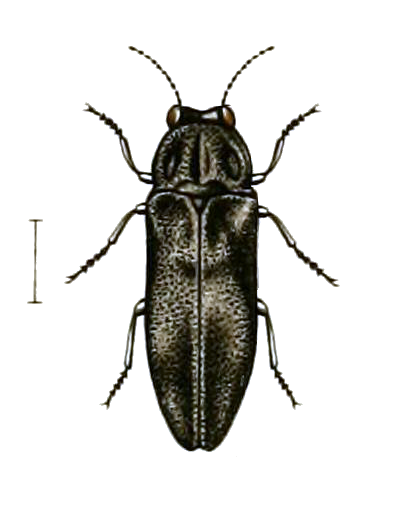
- Aaaaba nodosa

Scientific classification
- Kingdom: Animalia
- Phylum: Arthropoda
- Clade: Pancrustacea
- Class: Insecta
- Order: Coleoptera
- Suborder: Polyphaga
- Infraorder: Elateriformia
- Family: Buprestidae
- Subfamily: Agrilinae
- Tribe: Coraebini
- Subtribe: Cisseina
- Genus: Aaaaba; Bellamy, 2013

Synonyms
- Alcinous Deyrolle, 1864 (preoccupied by Alcinous Costa, 1812); Aaaba Bellamy, 2002 (preoccupied by Aaaba de Laubenfels, 1936)

= Aaaaba =

Genus of beetles

Aaaaba is a genus of beetles that belongs to the family Buprestidae. This genus inhabits locations along the east coast of Australia being found in New South Wales, Queensland and Victoria.

== Taxonomy ==
It was described in 1864 by Achille Deyrolle as "Alcinous", a junior homonym of a genus of pycnogonids. In 2002, Charles Bellamy gave it the replacement name "Aaaba", but this proved to be another junior homonym, of a genus of sponges. In 2013, it was given a further replacement name, becoming Aaaaba.

The genus name is feminine under ICZN Article 30.2.4 ("If no gender was specified or indicated, the name is to be treated as masculine, except that, if the name ends in -a the gender is feminine").

=== Species ===
There are two described species within this genus. They are listed below:

- Aaaaba nodosa (Deyrolle, 1865)
- Aaaaba fossicollis (Kerremans, 1903)
