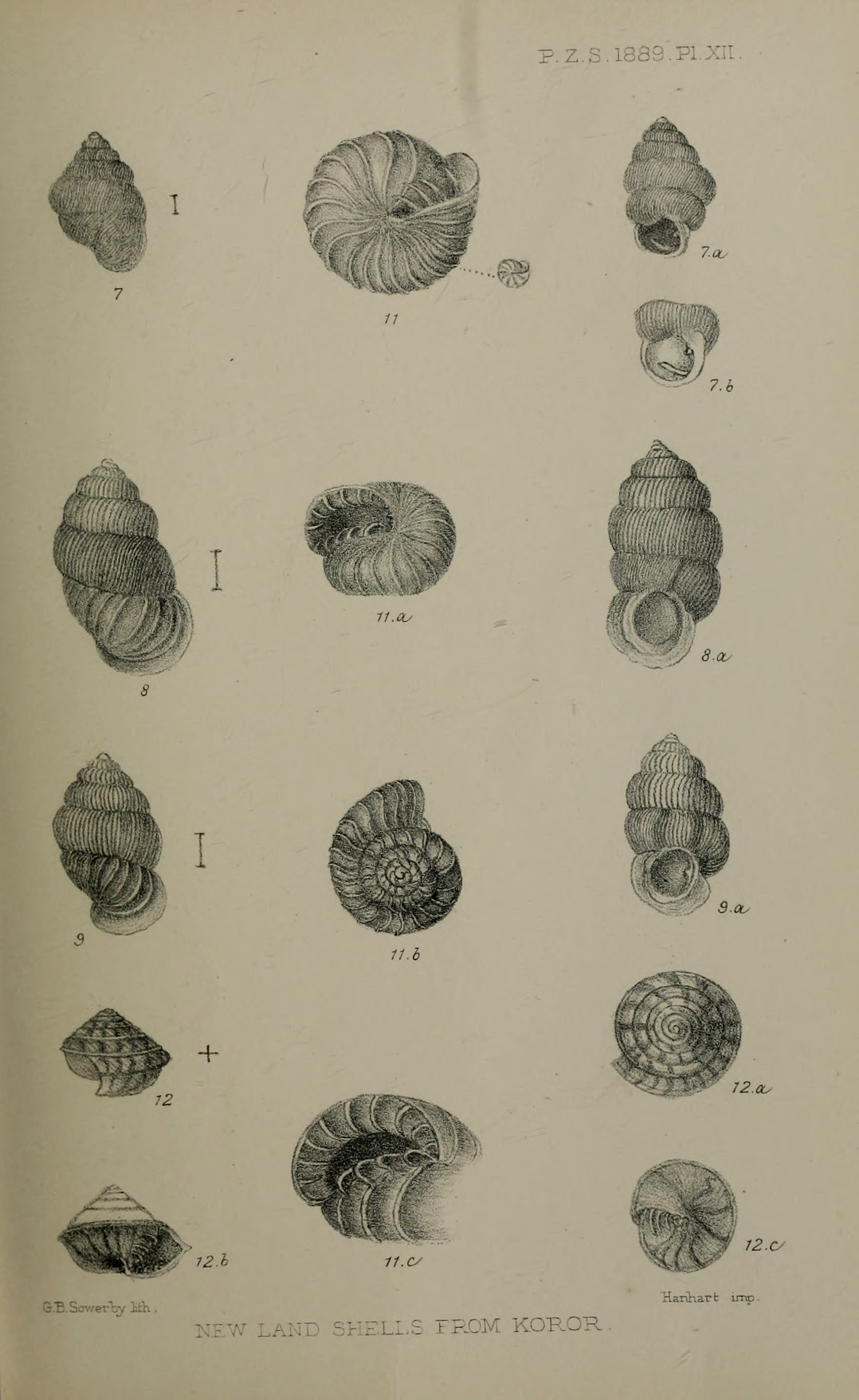
- Aaadonta fuscozonata shell (figure 12)

Scientific classification
- Kingdom: Animalia
- Phylum: Mollusca
- Class: Gastropoda
- Order: Stylommatophora
- Family: Endodontidae
- Genus: Aaadonta; Solem, 1976

= Aaadonta =

Genus of gastropods

Aaadonta was a genus of air-breathing land snails, terrestrial pulmonate gastropod mollusks in the family Endodontidae. Specimens from this genus are endemic to Palau.

== Species ==
Species in the genus Aaadonta include:

- Aaadonta angaurana Solem, 1976
- Aaadonta constricta Semper, 1874; Type species
- Aaadonta fuscozonata (E.H. Beddome, 1889)
- Aaadonta irregularis Semper, 1874
- Aaadonta kinlochi Solem, 1976
- Aaadonta pelewana Solem, 1976

The genus was given its unusual name by the biologist Alan Solem, who wanted it to appear first in any alphabetical list of endodontid genera. For animal genera, the first alphabetically listed name is Aaaaba, which is a genus of beetles from Australia. The current conservation status, according to the IUCN Red List, varies depending on species, though they all fall into the larger category of being threatened. One cause of a low population stated by Solem could be that ant colonies that come into the area can prey on eggs of the various species, thus wiping out a large number of snails, potentially without harming the adult snails. Some species, such as A. fuscozonata, have not been found recently, leading researchers to believe that they may already be extinct.

== Establishing the genus ==
While single localities had been found before Alan Solem established the genus, such as Aaadonta angaurana in 1936, the six species were first defined in Solem's 1976 paper. Solem defined the genus' and species qualities in 8 rules defining shell shape.

But since the genus was established, many of the species within it have been difficult to keep track of. A report in 2005 only found Aaandonta constricta and Aaandonta kinlochi.

== Environment ==
The habitat where Aaadonta were typically found ranged from primary forests to secondary forests, and even to mountain bases. However, they usually resided on the underside of natural resources. Moreover, they were found under rocks or stones, and under leaves. Some species were found living on dead plants and low levels of trees, as well as on the moss of some boulders.

== See also ==
- Zyzzyxdonta
