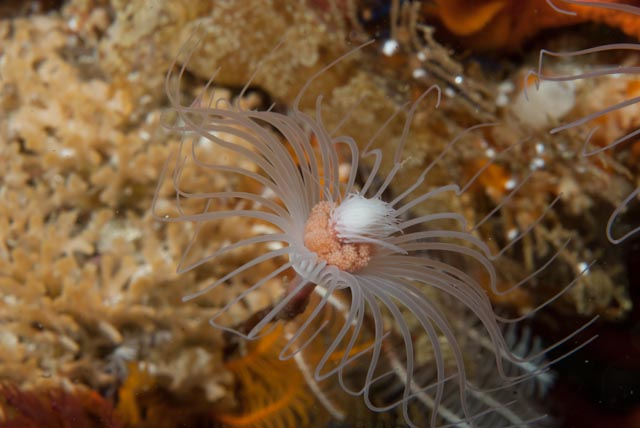
- Ectopleura crocea offshore False Cape

Scientific classification
- Kingdom: Animalia
- Phylum: Cnidaria
- Class: Hydrozoa
- Order: Anthoathecata
- Suborder: Aplanulata
- Family: Tubulariidae; Goldfuss, 1818

Synonyms
- Hybocodonidae Allman, 1872; Tubulariae (lapsus)

= Tubulariidae =

Family of hydrozoans

Tubulariidae is a family of hydroid cnidarians. For long placed in a presumed superfamily or infraorder Tubulariida of suborder Capitata, they are actually close relatives of the Hydridae and are now united with these and a number of relatives in a newly recognized suborder Aplanulata. Most if not all species in this family grow on stalks and resemble small flowers.

According to the World Register of Marine Species, the following genera are found in this family:

- Bouillonia Petersen, 1990
- Ectopleura
- Hybocodon L. Agassiz, 1860
- Lobataria Watson, 2008
- Ralpharia Watson, 1980
- Tubularia
- Zyzzyzus
