= Idiostethus dispersus =

Scientific classification
- Kingdom: Animalia
- Phylum: Arthropoda
- Class: Insecta
- Order: Coleoptera
- Suborder: Polyphaga
- Infraorder: Cucujiformia
- Family: Curculionidae
- Tribe: Apostasimerini
- Genus: Idiostethus
- Species: I. dispersus

Binomial name
- Idiostethus dispersus Casey, 1892

Species of beetle

Idiostethus dispersus is a species of flower weevil in the beetle family Curculionidae. It is found in North America.
