= Acentrinops =

Scientific classification
- Kingdom: Animalia
- Phylum: Arthropoda
- Class: Insecta
- Order: Coleoptera
- Suborder: Polyphaga
- Infraorder: Cucujiformia
- Family: Curculionidae
- Subfamily: Baridinae
- Tribe: Apostasimerini
- Genus: Acentrinops; Casey, 1920
- Species: A. brevicollis

Binomial name
- Acentrinops brevicollis Casey, 1920

Genus of beetles

Acentrinops is a genus of flower weevils in the beetle family Curculionidae. There is one described species in Acentrinops, A. brevicollis.
