= Catapastus =

Scientific classification
- Domain: Eukaryota
- Kingdom: Animalia
- Phylum: Arthropoda
- Class: Insecta
- Order: Coleoptera
- Suborder: Polyphaga
- Infraorder: Cucujiformia
- Family: Curculionidae
- Subfamily: Baridinae
- Tribe: Apostasimerini
- Genus: Catapastus; Casey, 1892

Genus of beetles

Catapastus is a genus of flower weevils in the beetle family Curculionidae. There are about nine described species in Catapastus.

== Species ==
These nine species belong to the genus Catapastus:

- Catapastus albonotatus Linell, 1897
- Catapastus conspersus (LeConte, 1876)
- Catapastus diffusus Casey, 1892
- Catapastus nivescens Champion & G.C., 1909
- Catapastus ruficlava Champion & G.C., 1909
- Catapastus seriatus Casey, 1920
- Catapastus signatipennis Linell, 1897
- Catapastus simplex Casey, 1920
- Catapastus squamirostris Casey, 1920
