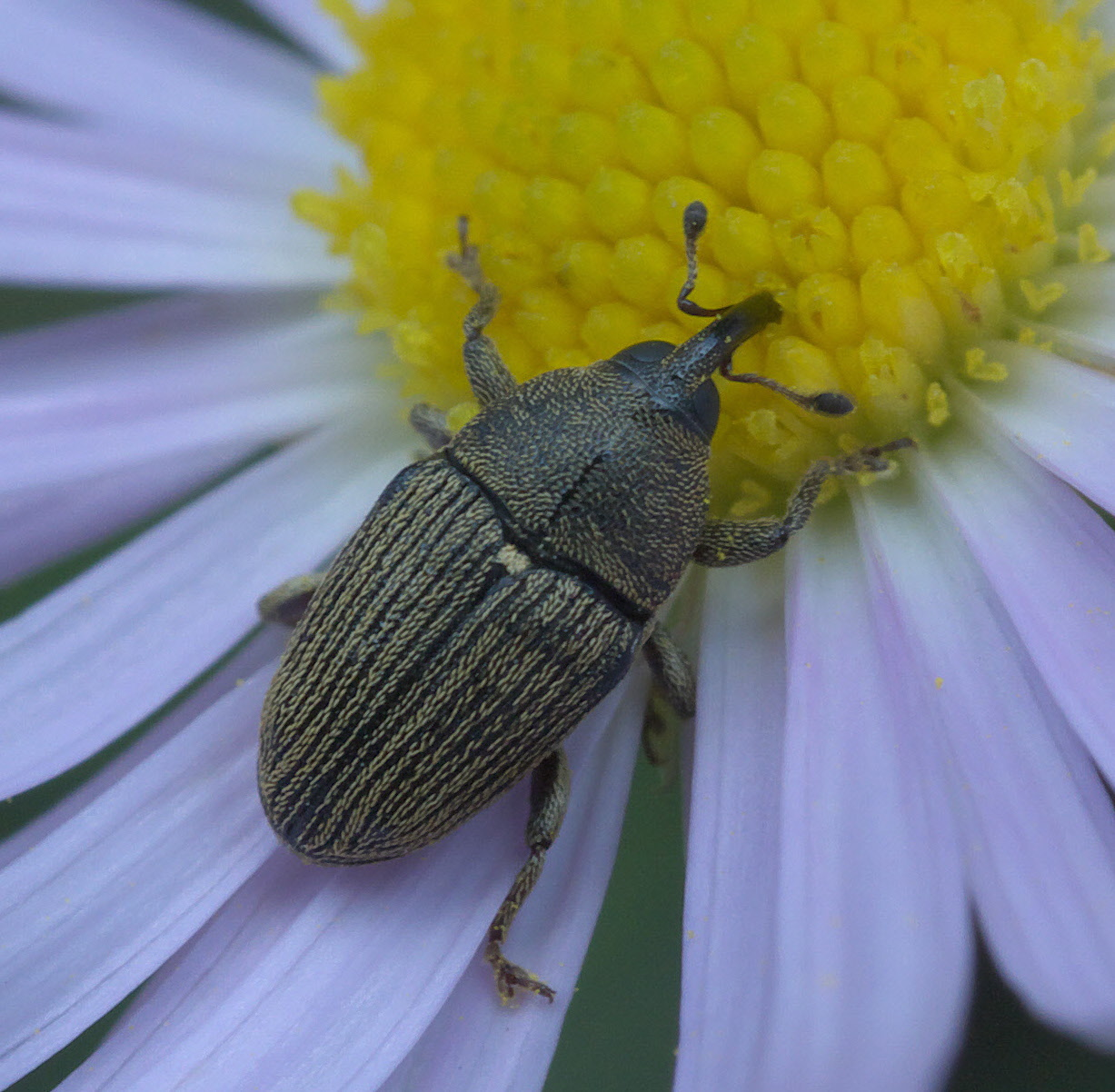

Scientific classification
- Domain: Eukaryota
- Kingdom: Animalia
- Phylum: Arthropoda
- Class: Insecta
- Order: Coleoptera
- Suborder: Polyphaga
- Infraorder: Cucujiformia
- Family: Curculionidae
- Subfamily: Baridinae
- Tribe: Apostasimerini
- Genus: Odontocorynus; Schönherr, 1844

= Odontocorynus =

Genus of beetles

Odontocorynus is a genus of flower weevils in the family of beetles known as Curculionidae. There are 16 described species in Odontocorynus. Now taxonomists place it in the tribe Madarini.

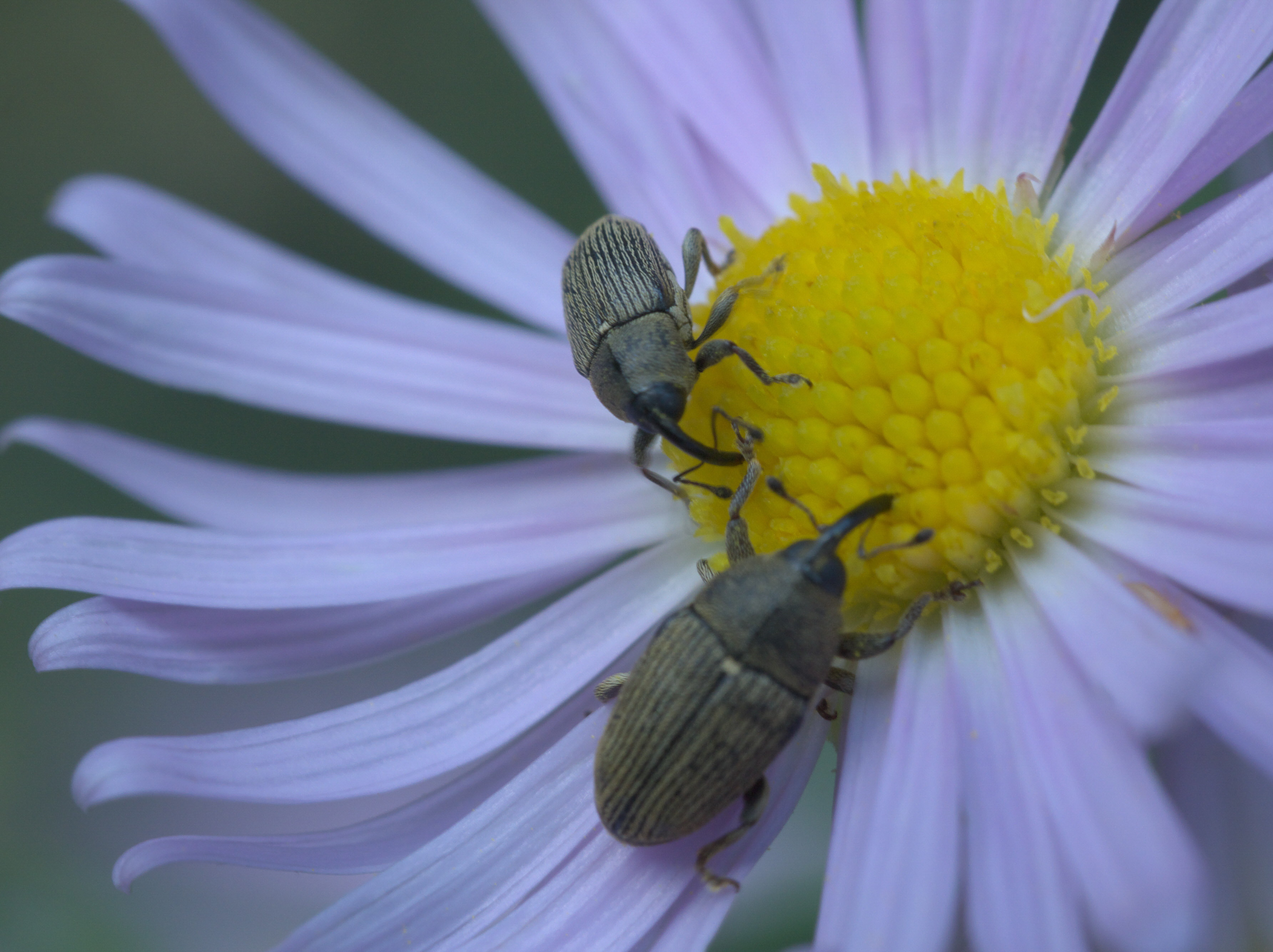

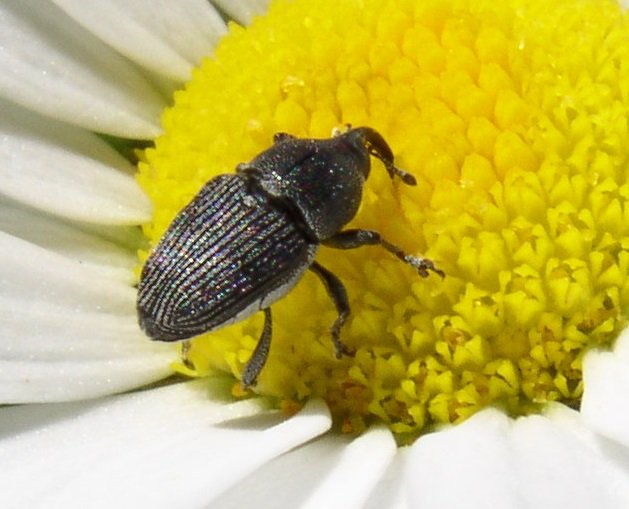
Odontocorynus umbellae

== Species ==
- Odontocorynus calcarifer Prena, 2008
- Odontocorynus creperus Boheman, 1844
- Odontocorynus falsus (LeConte, 1876)
- Odontocorynus histriculus Casey, 1920
- Odontocorynus larvatus (Boheman, 1844)
- Odontocorynus latiscapus Champion, 1908
- Odontocorynus luteogramma Prena, 2008
- Odontocorynus nunume Prena, 2008
- Odontocorynus procerus Prena, 2008
- Odontocorynus pulverulentus (Casey, 1892)
- Odontocorynus salebrosus (Casey, 1892)
- Odontocorynus subvittatus Casey, 1920
- Odontocorynus suturaflava Champion, 1908
- Odontocorynus tectus Champion, 1908
- Odontocorynus townsendi (Casey, 1920)
- Odontocorynus umbellae (Fabricius, 1801)
