= Cylindrocerus =

Scientific classification
- Kingdom: Animalia
- Phylum: Arthropoda
- Class: Insecta
- Order: Coleoptera
- Suborder: Polyphaga
- Infraorder: Cucujiformia
- Family: Curculionidae
- Subfamily: Baridinae
- Tribe: Apostasimerini
- Subtribe: Zygobaridina
- Genus: Cylindrocerus; Schönherr, 1825

Species
- About 60 species.

Genus of beetles

Cylindrocerus is a genus of true weevils in the tribe Apostasimerini. Species are found in the Americas.
