= Idiostethus =

Scientific classification
- Kingdom: Animalia
- Phylum: Arthropoda
- Class: Insecta
- Order: Coleoptera
- Suborder: Polyphaga
- Infraorder: Cucujiformia
- Family: Curculionidae
- Subfamily: Baridinae
- Tribe: Apostasimerini
- Genus: Idiostethus; Casey, 1892

Genus of beetles

Idiostethus is a genus of flower weevils in the beetle family Curculionidae. There are at least 20 described species in Idiostethus.

== Species ==
These 20 species belong to the genus Idiostethus:

- Idiostethus brevipennis Casey, 1920
- Idiostethus densicollis Casey, 1920
- Idiostethus dispersus Casey, 1892
- Idiostethus ellipsoideus Casey & T.L., 1892
- Idiostethus humeralis Casey, 1920
- Idiostethus illustris Casey, 1920
- Idiostethus minutus Casey, 1920
- Idiostethus nanulus Casey, 1920
- Idiostethus ovatulus Casey, T.L., 1920
- Idiostethus ovulatus Casey, 1920
- Idiostethus parvicollis Casey, 1920
- Idiostethus proximus Casey, 1920
- Idiostethus puncticollis Casey, 1920
- Idiostethus rugicollis Casey, 1920
- Idiostethus spiniger Casey, 1920
- Idiostethus strigapunctus Ham., 1893
- Idiostethus strigosciollis Casey
- Idiostethus strigosicollis Casey, 1920
- Idiostethus subcalvus (LeConte, 1878)
- Idiostethus tubulatus (Say, 1831)
