= Madopterina =

Scientific classification
- Domain: Eukaryota
- Kingdom: Animalia
- Phylum: Arthropoda
- Class: Insecta
- Order: Coleoptera
- Suborder: Polyphaga
- Infraorder: Cucujiformia
- Family: Curculionidae
- Subfamily: Baridinae
- Tribe: Apostasimerini
- Subtribe: Madopterina; Lacordaire, 1865

Genera
- See text

Subtribe of weevils

Madopterina is a true weevil subtribe in the subfamily Baridinae.

== Genera ==
- Azygides Pascoe, 1880
- Centrinopsis Roelofs, 1875
- Iasides Champion, 1907
- Lipancylus Wollaston, 1873
- Madopterus Schoenherr, 1836
- Opseobaris Bondar, 1942
- Pacomes Casey, 1922
- Parallelosomus Schoenherr, 1844
- Trachymeropsis Champion, 1907
- Trachymerus Schoenherr, 1844
- Xenopsilus Faust, 1899
