= Cholinobaris =

Scientific classification
- Kingdom: Animalia
- Phylum: Arthropoda
- Class: Insecta
- Order: Coleoptera
- Suborder: Polyphaga
- Infraorder: Cucujiformia
- Family: Curculionidae
- Subfamily: Baridinae
- Tribe: Apostasimerini
- Genus: Cholinobaris; Casey, 1920
- Species: C. rhomboidea

Binomial name
- Cholinobaris rhomboidea Casey, 1920

Genus of beetles

Cholinobaris is a genus of flower weevils in the beetle family Curculionidae. There is one described species in Cholinobaris, C. rhomboidea.
