= Catapastus squamirostris =

Scientific classification
- Kingdom: Animalia
- Phylum: Arthropoda
- Class: Insecta
- Order: Coleoptera
- Suborder: Polyphaga
- Infraorder: Cucujiformia
- Family: Curculionidae
- Tribe: Apostasimerini
- Genus: Catapastus
- Species: C. squamirostris

Binomial name
- Catapastus squamirostris Casey, 1920

Species of beetle

Catapastus squamirostris is a species of flower weevil in the beetle family Curculionidae. It is found in North America.
