= Zygobarinus =

Scientific classification
- Kingdom: Animalia
- Phylum: Arthropoda
- Clade: Pancrustacea
- Class: Insecta
- Order: Coleoptera
- Suborder: Polyphaga
- Infraorder: Cucujiformia
- Superfamily: Curculionoidea
- Family: Curculionidae
- Subfamily: Baridinae
- Tribe: Apostasimerini
- Genus: Zygobarinus; Pierce, 1907
- Species: Z. coelestinus

Binomial name
- Zygobarinus coelestinus (Linell, 1897)

Synonyms
- Zygobaris coelestinus Linell, 1897

Genus of beetles

Zygobarinus is a genus of flower weevils in the beetle family Curculionidae. There is one described species in Zygobarinus, Z. coelestinus.
