= Calandrinus =

Scientific classification
- Kingdom: Animalia
- Phylum: Arthropoda
- Class: Insecta
- Order: Coleoptera
- Suborder: Polyphaga
- Infraorder: Cucujiformia
- Family: Curculionidae
- Subfamily: Baridinae
- Tribe: Apostasimerini
- Genus: Calandrinus; LeConte, 1876

Genus of beetles

Calandrinus is a genus of flower weevils in the beetle family Curculionidae. There are at least four described species in Calandrinus.

== Species ==
These four species belong to the genus Calandrinus:

- Calandrinus angustulus Casey, 1920
- Calandrinus grandicollis LeConte, 1876
- Calandrinus insignis Casey & T.L., 1892
- Calandrinus obsoletus Casey, 1892
