= Dirabius =

Scientific classification
- Kingdom: Animalia
- Phylum: Arthropoda
- Class: Insecta
- Order: Coleoptera
- Suborder: Polyphaga
- Infraorder: Cucujiformia
- Family: Curculionidae
- Tribe: Apostasimerini
- Genus: Dirabius; Casey, 1920

Genus of beetles

Dirabius is a genus of flower weevils in the beetle family Curculionidae. There are about 11 described species in Dirabius.

== Species ==
These 11 species belong to the genus Dirabius:

- Dirabius atromicans Casey, 1920
- Dirabius californicus Casey, 1920
- Dirabius calvus (LeConte, 1876)
- Dirabius inflaticollis Casey, 1920
- Dirabius mimus Casey, T.L., 1920
- Dirabius nimius Casey, 1920
- Dirabius promptus Casey, 1920
- Dirabius rectirostris (LeConte, 1876)
- Dirabius rotundicollis Casey, 1920
- Dirabius tentus Casey, 1920
- Dirabius tenua O'Brien & Wibmer, 1982
