= Pseudocentrinus =

Scientific classification
- Domain: Eukaryota
- Kingdom: Animalia
- Phylum: Arthropoda
- Class: Insecta
- Order: Coleoptera
- Suborder: Polyphaga
- Infraorder: Cucujiformia
- Family: Curculionidae
- Tribe: Apostasimerini
- Genus: Pseudocentrinus; Champion, 1908

Genus of beetles

Pseudocentrinus is a genus of flower weevils in the beetle family Curculionidae. There are about nine described species in Pseudocentrinus.

== Species ==
These nine species belong to the genus Pseudocentrinus:

- Pseudocentrinus deceptus Champion & G.C., 1908
- Pseudocentrinus hybrida Champion & G.C., 1908
- Pseudocentrinus lucidulus Hustache, 1930
- Pseudocentrinus mourei Bondar, 1944
- Pseudocentrinus ochraceus (Boheman, 1844)
- Pseudocentrinus punctatus Hustache, 1941
- Pseudocentrinus seriesetosus Hustache, 1924
- Pseudocentrinus sparsus Kuschel, 1955
- Pseudocentrinus uniformis Casey, 1920
