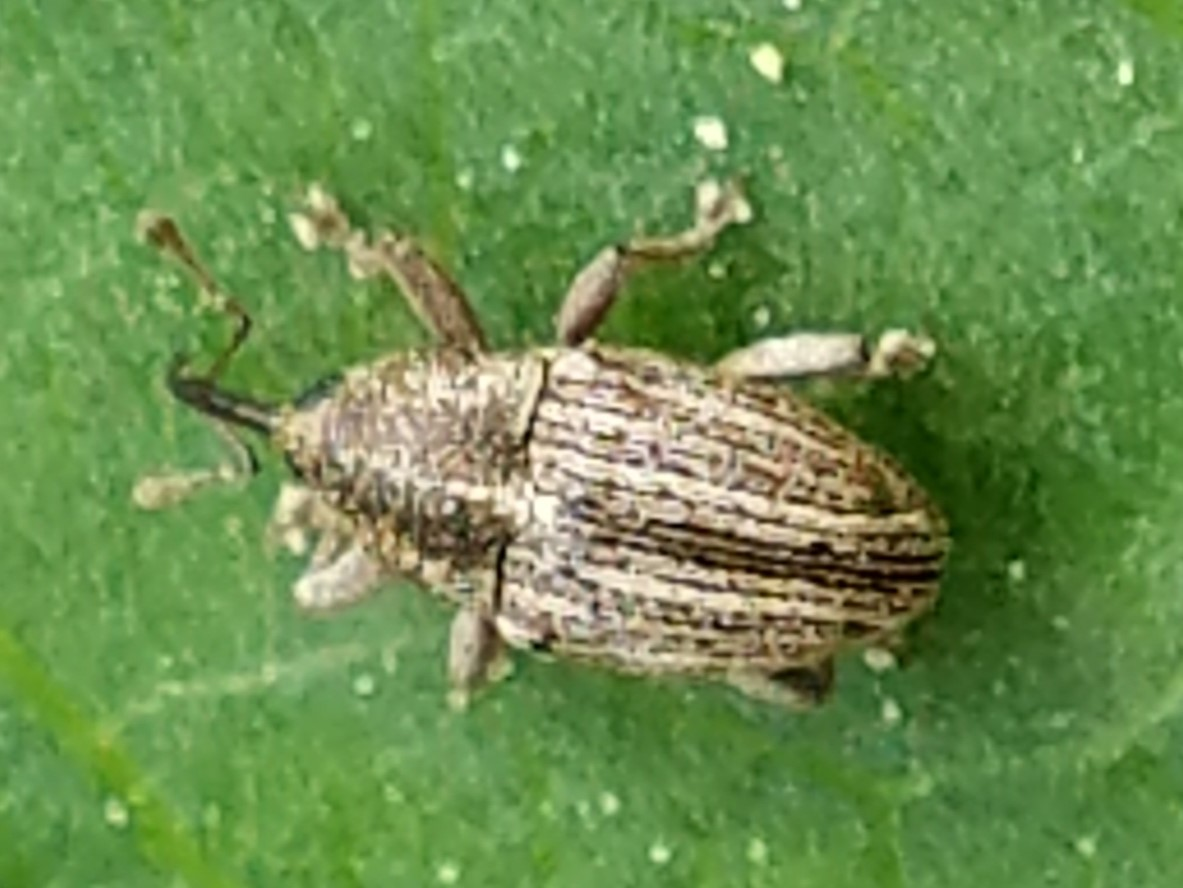

Scientific classification
- Kingdom: Animalia
- Phylum: Arthropoda
- Class: Insecta
- Order: Coleoptera
- Suborder: Polyphaga
- Infraorder: Cucujiformia
- Family: Curculionidae
- Genus: Centrinopus
- Species: C. helvinus

Binomial name
- Centrinopus helvinus Casey, 1892

= Centrinopus helvinus =

Species of beetle

Centrinopus helvinus is a species of flower weevil in the beetle family Curculionidae. It is found in North America.
