= Barilepton quadricolle =

Scientific classification
- Kingdom: Animalia
- Phylum: Arthropoda
- Class: Insecta
- Order: Coleoptera
- Suborder: Polyphaga
- Infraorder: Cucujiformia
- Family: Curculionidae
- Genus: Barilepton
- Species: B. quadricolle

Binomial name
- Barilepton quadricolle LeConte, 1876

Species of beetle

Barilepton quadricolle is a species of flower weevil in the beetle family Curculionidae. It is found in North America.
