= Sebaris palpalis =

Scientific classification
- Kingdom: Animalia
- Phylum: Arthropoda
- Clade: Pancrustacea
- Class: Insecta
- Order: Coleoptera
- Suborder: Polyphaga
- Infraorder: Scarabaeiformia
- Family: Scarabaeidae
- Genus: Sebaris
- Species: S. palpalis

Binomial name
- Sebaris palpalis Laporte, 1840

Species of beetle

Sebaris palpalis is a species of beetle of the family Scarabaeidae. It is found in South Africa (Western Cape).

== Description ==
Adults reach a length of about 15–19.5 mm (0.59–0.77 in). They are light chestnut-red, with the head, pronotum, scutellum, and underside clothed with very long and very dense sub-erect fulvous hairs, hiding the sculpture of the teguments. The clypeus is hollowed and with the margins very much reflexed, the outer part is produced obliquely outwardly, the outer angles of the anterior part are produced into a somewhat blunted tooth, while the anterior margin is also produced diagonally from the outer angle to the median part, where it is triangularly incised, with the angles of the incision forming two broad sub-triangular teeth, the outer angles of the anterior part are not quite as sharp in the female as in the male, the hollowed clypeus is closely punctate and moderately pubescent, the frontal part of the head is entirely hidden by the long hairs, but it is closely punctulate like the pronotum. The scutellum is sparingly punctate and smooth at the apex and the elytra are a little ampliated laterally past the humeral part, somewhat convex, glabrous, deeply and somewhat coarsely punctate, and having on each side four costules, they have an outer fringe of moderately long fulvous hairs. The pygidium is sparingly punctured.
