= Limnobaris =

Scientific classification
- Kingdom: Animalia
- Phylum: Arthropoda
- Class: Insecta
- Order: Coleoptera
- Suborder: Polyphaga
- Infraorder: Cucujiformia
- Family: Curculionidae
- Genus: Limnobaris; Bedel, 1885

Genus of beetles

Limnobaris is a genus of beetles belonging to the family Curculionidae.

The species of this genus are found in Europe, Japan and Northern America.

Species:

- Limnobaris aeneola G.C.Champion, 1908
- Limnobaris aeraria G.C.Champion, 1908
- Limnobaris albomaculata J.Desbrochers, 1892
- Limnobaris albosparsa Reitter, 1910
- Limnobaris alutacea G.C.Champion, 1908
- Limnobaris angulicollis J.Faust, 1896
- Limnobaris angustata G.C.Champion, 1908
- Limnobaris antillarum G.C.Champion, 1909
- Limnobaris atriplicis W.W.Fowler, 1913
- Limnobaris babai Chûjô & Morimoto, 1959
- Limnobaris barbiellini Leoni, 1907
- Limnobaris basalis (Voss, 1958) Voss, 1958
- Limnobaris basalis Prena, Korotyaev, Wang, Ren, Liu & Zhang, 2014
- Limnobaris bicincta G.C.Champion, 1908
- Limnobaris bifasciata G.C.Champion, 1908
- Limnobaris blanditus T.L.Casey, 1892
- Limnobaris boliviensis Hustache, 1924
- Limnobaris bracatus T.L.Casey, 1892
- Limnobaris breviscupa W.S.Blatchley & C.W.Leng, 1916
- Limnobaris calandriformis G.C.Champion, 1908
- Limnobaris calvus T.L.Casey, 1892
- Limnobaris carbonaria G.C.Champion, 1907
- Limnobaris concinna T.L.Casey, 1892
- Limnobaris concurrens T.L.Casey, 1892
- Limnobaris confinis T.L.Casey, 1892
- Limnobaris confusa T.L.Casey, 1892
- Limnobaris crocopelmus J.Desbrochers, 1892
- Limnobaris cylindriclava G.C.Champion, 1908
- Limnobaris deletangi Hustache, 1924
- Limnobaris dentifera G.C.Champion, 1908
- Limnobaris denudatus T.L.Casey, 1892
- Limnobaris deplanatus T.L.Casey, 1892
- Limnobaris desidiosa G.C.Champion, 1908
- Limnobaris discreta G.C.Champion, 1908
- Limnobaris dolorosa (J.A.E.Goeze, 1777)
- Limnobaris ebena T.L.Casey, 1892
- Limnobaris elliptica Prena, Korotyaev, Wang, Ren, Liu & Zhang, 2014
- Limnobaris evanescens G.C.Champion, 1908
- Limnobaris fraterculus T.L.Casey, 1892
- Limnobaris funerea A.Hustache, 1938
- Limnobaris griseus T.L.Casey, 1892
- Limnobaris hypoleuca A.Hustache, 1938
- Limnobaris japonica Yoshihara & Morimoto, 1994
- Limnobaris kabakovi Korotyaev
- Limnobaris kumei Prena, Korotyaev, Wang, Ren, Liu & Zhang, 2014
- Limnobaris languida G.C.Champion, 1908
- Limnobaris latidens G.C.Champion, 1908
- Limnobaris leucostigma G.C.Champion, 1908
- Limnobaris limbifer T.L.Casey, 1892
- Limnobaris lineigera Hartmann, 1904
- Limnobaris longulus T.L.Casey, 1892
- Limnobaris manducator G.C.Champion, 1908
- Limnobaris martensi Korotyaev, 2014
- Limnobaris martulus J.R.Sahlberg, 1890
- Limnobaris multistriata A.Hustache, 1932
- Limnobaris nasuta J.L.LeConte, 1859
- Limnobaris nasutus T.L.Casey, 1892
- Limnobaris nigrinus A.Hustache, 1938
- Limnobaris nitidissima T.L.Casey, 1892
- Limnobaris oblitus T.L.Casey, 1892
- Limnobaris parilis G.C.Champion, 1909
- Limnobaris parvula J.Faust, 1896
- Limnobaris pilistriata G.C.Champion, 1905
- Limnobaris planiusculus T.L.Casey, 1892
- Limnobaris prolixus T.L.Casey, 1892
- Limnobaris punctiger T.L.Casey, 1892
- Limnobaris pusio E.Reitter, 1895
- Limnobaris puteifera T.L.Casey, 1892
- Limnobaris pygmea G.C.Champion, 1908
- Limnobaris quadricollis G.C.Champion, 1908
- Limnobaris rectirostris T.L.Casey, 1892
- Limnobaris reitteri Munster, 1928
- Limnobaris rufinasus Hustache, 1924
- Limnobaris rufipes Hustache, 1924
- Limnobaris rufula G.C.Champion, 1908
- Limnobaris sanguinipes A.Hustache, 1938
- Limnobaris scolopacea J.Desbrochers, 1892
- Limnobaris seclusus T.L.Casey, 1892
- Limnobaris seminitens T.L.Casey, 1892
- Limnobaris sparsesquamulatus Hustache, 1932
- Limnobaris striatipennis Hustache, 1932
- Limnobaris t-album C.R.Sahlberg, 1900
- Limnobaris tabidus T.L.Casey, 1892
- Limnobaris tenua Blatchley & Leng, 1916
- Limnobaris tibialis (E.Voss, 1953)
- Limnobaris turquii G.C.Champion, 1908
- Limnobaris uniformis G.C.Champion, 1908
- Limnobaris uniseriatus Hustache, 1924
