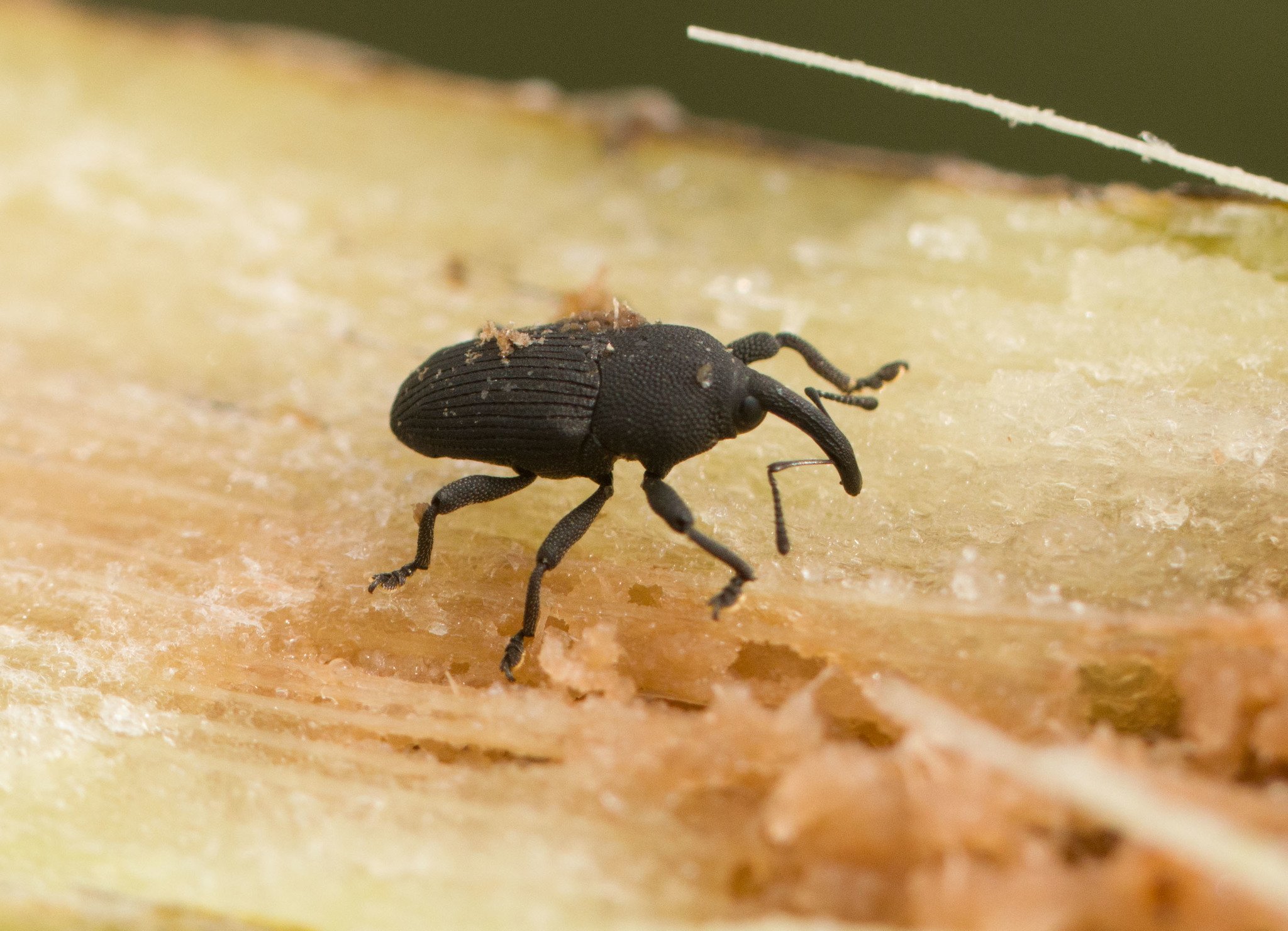
- Orchidophilus aterrimus

Scientific classification
- Kingdom: Animalia
- Phylum: Arthropoda
- Class: Insecta
- Order: Coleoptera
- Suborder: Polyphaga
- Infraorder: Cucujiformia
- Family: Curculionidae
- Subfamily: Baridinae
- Tribe: Madarini
- Genus: Orchidophilus; Buchanan, 1935

Species
- 6, see text

= Orchidophilus =

Genus of beetles

Orchidophilus is a genus of true weevils in the subfamily Baridinae. There are six species. These weevils live in orchids, and are known generally as orchid weevils. They are native to Indonesia, the Philippines, and surrounding islands, and they can sometimes be found in shipments of cultivated orchids. Two species, Orchiophilus aterrimus and O. perigrinator, are pests of orchids that have become naturalized outside their native range.

Species:

- Orchidophilus aterrimus
- Orchidophilus epidendri
- Orchidophilus eburifer
- Orchidophilus insidiosus
- Orchidophilus peregrinator
- Orchidophilus ran
