= Zygobaris =

Scientific classification
- Kingdom: Animalia
- Phylum: Arthropoda
- Class: Insecta
- Order: Coleoptera
- Suborder: Polyphaga
- Infraorder: Cucujiformia
- Family: Curculionidae
- Tribe: Apostasimerini
- Genus: Zygobaris; LeConte, 1876

Genus of beetles

Zygobaris is a genus of flower weevils in the beetle family Curculionidae. There are about eight described species in Zygobaris.

== Species ==
These eight species belong to the genus Zygobaris:

- Zygobaris centrinoides Green, 1920
- Zygobaris coelestinus Linell & M.L., 1897
- Zygobaris conspersus LeConte & J.L., 1876
- Zygobaris convexus LeConte & J.L., 1876
- Zygobaris nitens LeConte, 1876
- Zygobaris subcalvus LeConte & J.L., 1878
- Zygobaris tristicula Champion & G.C., 1908
- Zygobaris xanthoxyli Pierce & W.D., 1907
