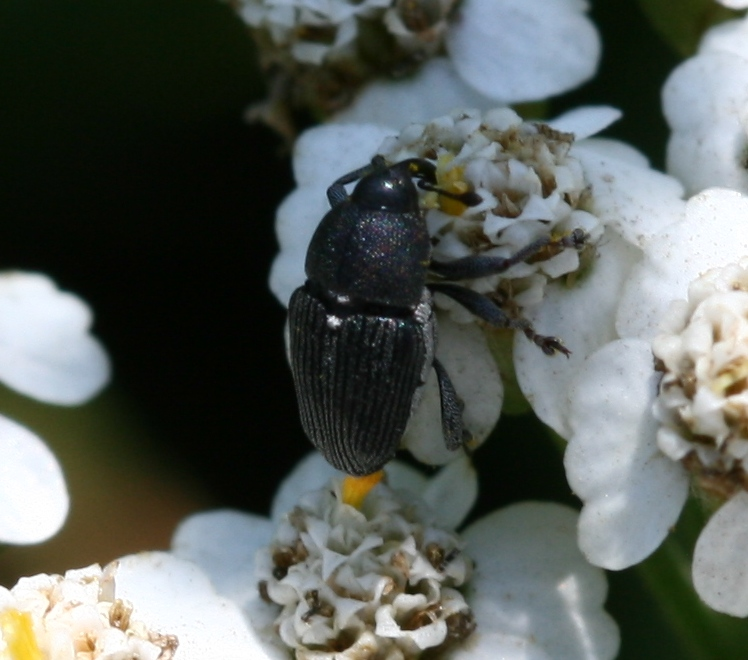

Scientific classification
- Kingdom: Animalia
- Phylum: Arthropoda
- Class: Insecta
- Order: Coleoptera
- Suborder: Polyphaga
- Infraorder: Cucujiformia
- Family: Curculionidae
- Genus: Odontocorynus
- Species: O. salebrosus

Binomial name
- Odontocorynus salebrosus Casey, 1892

Synonyms
- Centrinus denticornis Casey, 1892; Centrinus pinguescens Casey, 1892; O. alternans Casey, 1920; O. boonei Casey, 1920; O. convergens Casey, 1920; O. convexus Casey, 1920; O. criber Casey, 1920; O. dakotanus Casey, 1920; O. dallasianus Casey, 1920; O. defectus Casey, 1920; O. greeleyi Casey, 1920; O. ignotus Casey, 1920; O. inflaticollis Casey, 1920; O. inspectus Casey, 1920; O. iowensis Casey, 1920; O. latiusculus Casey, 1920; O. longicollis Casey, 1920; O. missourianus Casey, 1920; O. ochreosus Casey, 1920; O. onagensis Casey, 1920; O. parallelus Casey, 1920; O. parvus Casey, 1920; O. pennianus Casey, 1920; O. prominens Casey, 1920; O. pusillus Casey, 1920; O. quadraticollis Casey, 1920; O. regularis Casey, 1920; O. robustus Casey, 1920; O. rotundicollis Casey, 1920; O. snowi Casey, 1920; O. vicksburgensis Casey, 1920

= Odontocorynus salebrosus =

Species of beetle

Odontocorynus salebrosus is a species of weevils in the family Curculionidae. It occurs in Canada and U.S.A.
