= Trichodirabius longulus =

Scientific classification
- Domain: Eukaryota
- Kingdom: Animalia
- Phylum: Arthropoda
- Class: Insecta
- Order: Coleoptera
- Suborder: Polyphaga
- Infraorder: Cucujiformia
- Family: Curculionidae
- Genus: Trichodirabius
- Species: T. longulus

Binomial name
- Trichodirabius longulus (LeConte, 1876)

Species of beetle

Trichodirabius longulus is a species of flower weevil in the beetle family Curculionidae. It is found in North America.
