= Eisonyx =

Scientific classification
- Kingdom: Animalia
- Phylum: Arthropoda
- Class: Insecta
- Order: Coleoptera
- Suborder: Polyphaga
- Infraorder: Cucujiformia
- Family: Curculionidae
- Tribe: Apostasimerini
- Genus: Eisonyx; LeConte, 1880

Genus of beetles

Eisonyx is a genus of flower weevils in the beetle family Curculionidae. There are three described species in Eisonyx.

== Species ==
- Eisonyx crassipes LeConte, 1880
- Eisonyx opacus (Casey, 1893)
- Eisonyx picipes Pierce, 1916
