= Oligolochus =

Scientific classification
- Kingdom: Animalia
- Phylum: Arthropoda
- Class: Insecta
- Order: Coleoptera
- Suborder: Polyphaga
- Infraorder: Cucujiformia
- Family: Curculionidae
- Tribe: Apostasimerini
- Genus: Oligolochus; Casey, 1892

Genus of beetles

Oligolochus is a genus of flower weevils in the beetle family Curculionidae. There are about 12 described species in Oligolochus.

== Species ==
These 12 species belong to the genus Oligolochus:

- Oligolochus albosignatus Kuschel, 1983
- Oligolochus bracatoides Prena, 2009
- Oligolochus bracatus (Casey, 1892)
- Oligolochus convexus (LeConte, 1876)
- Oligolochus deletangi Kuschel, 1983
- Oligolochus longipennis Linell
- Oligolochus minuens (Casey, 1920)
- Oligolochus ornatus (Casey, 1920)
- Oligolochus ovulatus (Casey, 1920)
- Oligolochus robustus Linell & M.L., 1897
- Oligolochus seclusus (Casey, 1892)
- Oligolochus vicarius (Blatchley, 1928)
