= Dirabius rotundicollis =

Scientific classification
- Kingdom: Animalia
- Phylum: Arthropoda
- Class: Insecta
- Order: Coleoptera
- Suborder: Polyphaga
- Infraorder: Cucujiformia
- Family: Curculionidae
- Genus: Dirabius
- Species: D. rotundicollis

Binomial name
- Dirabius rotundicollis Casey, 1920

Species of beetle

Dirabius rotundicollis is a species of flower weevil in the beetle family Curculionidae. It is found in North America.
