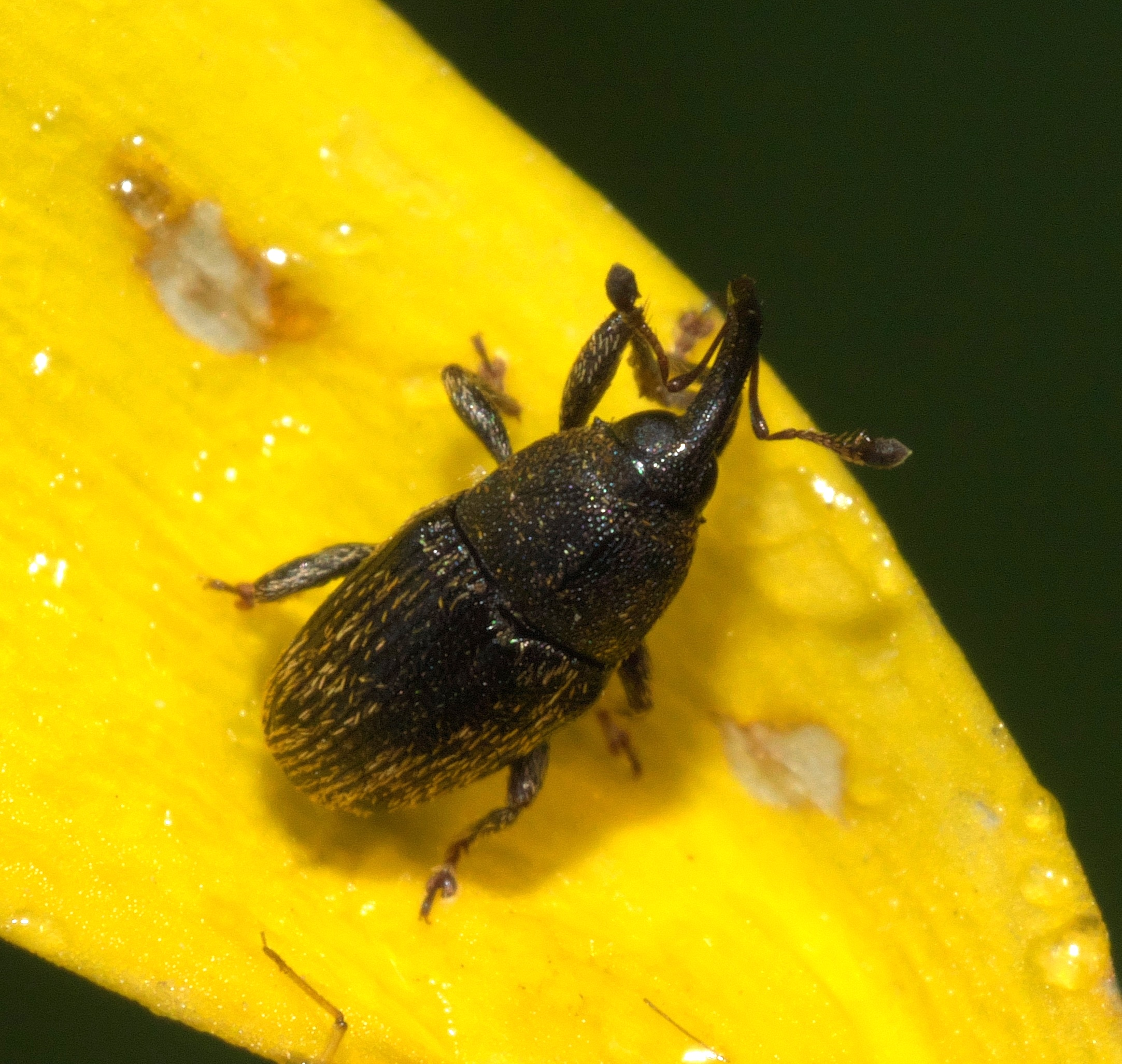
- Odontocorynus falsus, Oklahoma

Scientific classification
- Kingdom: Animalia
- Phylum: Arthropoda
- Class: Insecta
- Order: Coleoptera
- Suborder: Polyphaga
- Infraorder: Cucujiformia
- Family: Curculionidae
- Genus: Odontocorynus
- Species: O. falsus

Binomial name
- Odontocorynus falsus (LeConte, 1876)

= Odontocorynus falsus =

Species of beetle

Odontocorynus falsus is a species of flower weevil in the beetle family Curculionidae. It is found in North America.
