= Barilepton filiforme =

Scientific classification
- Kingdom: Animalia
- Phylum: Arthropoda
- Class: Insecta
- Order: Coleoptera
- Suborder: Polyphaga
- Infraorder: Cucujiformia
- Family: Curculionidae
- Genus: Barilepton
- Species: B. filiforme

Binomial name
- Barilepton filiforme LeConte, 1876

Species of beetle

Barilepton filiforme is a species of flower weevil in the beetle family Curculionidae. It is found in North America.
