= Odontocorynus pulverulentus =

Scientific classification
- Domain: Eukaryota
- Kingdom: Animalia
- Phylum: Arthropoda
- Class: Insecta
- Order: Coleoptera
- Suborder: Polyphaga
- Infraorder: Cucujiformia
- Family: Curculionidae
- Genus: Odontocorynus
- Species: O. pulverulentus

Binomial name
- Odontocorynus pulverulentus (Casey, 1892)

Synonyms
- O. coloradensis Casey, 1920; O. densissimus Casey, 1920; O. lulingensis Casey, 1920

Species of beetle

Odontocorynus pulverulentus is a species of flower weevil in the beetle family Curculionidae. It is found in North America.
