= Cylindridia prolixa =

Scientific classification
- Kingdom: Animalia
- Phylum: Arthropoda
- Class: Insecta
- Order: Coleoptera
- Suborder: Polyphaga
- Infraorder: Cucujiformia
- Family: Curculionidae
- Genus: Cylindridia
- Species: C. prolixa

Binomial name
- Cylindridia prolixa (LeConte, 1876)

Synonyms
- Limnobaris nitidissima Casey, 1892; Cylindridia perexilis Casey, 1920; Cylindridia simulator Casey, 1920

Species of beetle

Cylindridia prolixa is a species of flower weevil in the beetle family Curculionidae.
