= Centrinopus =

Scientific classification
- Kingdom: Animalia
- Phylum: Arthropoda
- Class: Insecta
- Order: Coleoptera
- Suborder: Polyphaga
- Infraorder: Cucujiformia
- Family: Curculionidae
- Tribe: Apostasimerini
- Genus: Centrinopus; Casey, 1892

Genus of beetles

Centrinopus is a genus of flower weevils in the beetle family Curculionidae. There are about 19 described species in Centrinopus.

== Species ==
These 19 species belong to the genus Centrinopus:

- Centrinopus alternatus Casey, 1892
- Centrinopus angusticollis Casey, 1920
- Centrinopus astutus Kuschel, 1983
- Centrinopus brevior Casey, 1920
- Centrinopus curtulatus Casey, 1920
- Centrinopus delicatulus Hustache, 1950
- Centrinopus elegantulus Hustache, 1950
- Centrinopus erythropus Champion & G.C., 1908
- Centrinopus furfurosus Champion & G.C., 1908
- Centrinopus helvinus Casey, 1892
- Centrinopus longulus Casey, 1922
- Centrinopus lucifer Casey, 1920
- Centrinopus mendax Casey & T.L., 1920
- Centrinopus mixtus Champion & G.C., 1909
- Centrinopus rugicollis Casey, 1920
- Centrinopus scutellinus Casey, 1920
- Centrinopus tabascanus Casey, 1920
- Centrinopus tectus Casey, 1922
- Centrinopus uniseriatus Casey, 1920
