= Haplostethops =

- Mating pair

Scientific classification
- Kingdom: Animalia
- Phylum: Arthropoda
- Clade: Pancrustacea
- Class: Insecta
- Order: Coleoptera
- Suborder: Polyphaga
- Infraorder: Cucujiformia
- Superfamily: Curculionoidea
- Family: Curculionidae
- Tribe: Apostasimerini
- Genus: Haplostethops; Casey, 1920

Genus of beetles

Haplostethops is a genus of flower weevils in the beetle family Curculionidae. There are about eight described species in the genus Haplostethops. The genus name is masculine, contrary to some sources, following ICZN Article 30.1.4.3: "A compound genus-group name ending in -ops is to be treated as masculine, regardless of its derivation or of its treatment by its author."

== Species ==
These eight species belong to the genus Haplostethops:

- Haplostethops caviventris Blatchley, 1922
- Haplostethops ellipsoideus (Casey, 1892)
- Haplostethops elongatus Casey, 1920
- Haplostethops fusiformis Casey, 1920
- Haplostethops gravidulus Casey, 1920
- Haplostethops marginatus Casey, 1920
- Haplostethops scaphinellus Casey, 1920
