= Microcholus =

Scientific classification
- Kingdom: Animalia
- Phylum: Arthropoda
- Class: Insecta
- Order: Coleoptera
- Suborder: Polyphaga
- Infraorder: Cucujiformia
- Family: Curculionidae
- Tribe: Apostasimerini
- Genus: Microcholus; LeConte, 1876

Genus of beetles

Microcholus is a genus of flower weevils in the beetle family Curculionidae. There are at least four described species in Microcholus.

== Species ==
These four species belong to the genus Microcholus:

- Microcholus erasus LeConte & J.L., 1880
- Microcholus laevicollis LeConte & J.L., 1876
- Microcholus puncticollis LeConte, 1876
- Microcholus striatus LeConte, 1876
