= Sibariops confinis =

Scientific classification
- Kingdom: Animalia
- Phylum: Arthropoda
- Class: Insecta
- Order: Coleoptera
- Suborder: Polyphaga
- Infraorder: Cucujiformia
- Family: Curculionidae
- Genus: Sibariops
- Species: S. confinis

Binomial name
- Sibariops confinis (LeConte, 1876)

Species of beetle

Sibariops confinis is a species of flower weevil in the beetle family Curculionidae.
