= Microcholus striatus =

Scientific classification
- Kingdom: Animalia
- Phylum: Arthropoda
- Class: Insecta
- Order: Coleoptera
- Suborder: Polyphaga
- Infraorder: Cucujiformia
- Family: Curculionidae
- Genus: Microcholus
- Species: M. striatus

Binomial name
- Microcholus striatus LeConte, 1876

Species of beetle

Microcholus striatus is a species of flower weevil in the beetle family Curculionidae. It is found in North America.
