= Cylindridia perexilis =

Scientific classification
- Kingdom: Animalia
- Phylum: Arthropoda
- Class: Insecta
- Order: Coleoptera
- Suborder: Polyphaga
- Infraorder: Cucujiformia
- Family: Curculionidae
- Genus: Cylindridia
- Species: C. perexilis

Binomial name
- Cylindridia perexilis Casey, 1920

Species of beetle

Cylindridia perexilis is a species of flower weevil in the beetle family Curculionidae. It is found in North America.
