= Centrinogyna hispidula =

Scientific classification
- Kingdom: Animalia
- Phylum: Arthropoda
- Class: Insecta
- Order: Coleoptera
- Suborder: Polyphaga
- Infraorder: Cucujiformia
- Family: Curculionidae
- Genus: Centrinogyna
- Species: C. hispidula

Binomial name
- Centrinogyna hispidula Casey, 1920

Species of beetle

Centrinogyna hispidula is a species of flower weevil in the family of beetles known as Curculionidae. It is found in North America. Its range is from Arizona to Mexico.
