= Barilepis grisea =

Scientific classification
- Kingdom: Animalia
- Phylum: Arthropoda
- Class: Insecta
- Order: Coleoptera
- Suborder: Polyphaga
- Infraorder: Cucujiformia
- Family: Curculionidae
- Genus: Barilepis
- Species: B. grisea

Binomial name
- Barilepis grisea (LeConte, 1876)

Species of beetle

Barilepis grisea is a species of flower weevil in the beetle family Curculionidae. It is found in North America.
