= Geraeus picumnus =

Scientific classification
- Domain: Eukaryota
- Kingdom: Animalia
- Phylum: Arthropoda
- Class: Insecta
- Order: Coleoptera
- Suborder: Polyphaga
- Infraorder: Cucujiformia
- Family: Curculionidae
- Genus: Geraeus
- Species: G. picumnus

Binomial name
- Geraeus picumnus Champion, G.C., 1908

Species of beetle

Geraeus picumnus is a species of flower weevil in the family of beetles known as Curculionidae.
