= Buchananius sulcatus =

Scientific classification
- Kingdom: Animalia
- Phylum: Arthropoda
- Class: Insecta
- Order: Coleoptera
- Suborder: Polyphaga
- Infraorder: Cucujiformia
- Family: Curculionidae
- Genus: Buchananius
- Species: B. sulcatus

Binomial name
- Buchananius sulcatus (LeConte, 1876)

Species of beetle

Buchananius sulcatus is a species of flower weevil in the beetle family Curculionidae. It is found in North America. The development takes place in fungi.
