= Nicentrus =

Scientific classification
- Kingdom: Animalia
- Phylum: Arthropoda
- Class: Insecta
- Order: Coleoptera
- Suborder: Polyphaga
- Infraorder: Cucujiformia
- Family: Curculionidae
- Tribe: Apostasimerini
- Genus: Nicentrus; Casey, 1892

Genus of beetles

Nicentrus is a genus of flower weevils in the beetle family Curculionidae. There are more than 90 described species in Nicentrus.

== Species ==
These 92 species belong to the genus Nicentrus:

- Nicentrus abruptus Casey, 1922
- Nicentrus adspersus Hustache & A., 1938
- Nicentrus alabamae Casey, 1920
- Nicentrus albopictus Hustache & A., 1938
- Nicentrus amazonicus Casey, 1922
- Nicentrus antennalis Hustache, 1950
- Nicentrus australis Casey, 1922
- Nicentrus bifrons Kuschel, 1955
- Nicentrus biplagiatus Hustache & A., 1938
- Nicentrus brasiliensis Hustache, 1950
- Nicentrus candidulus Champion & G.C., 1908
- Nicentrus canus Blatchley, W.S., Leng & C.W., 1916
- Nicentrus chapadanus Casey, 1922
- Nicentrus chihuahuae Casey & T.L., 1920
- Nicentrus chihuhuae Casey, 1920
- Nicentrus circumcinctus Hustache, 1950
- Nicentrus columbicus Hustache, 1950
- Nicentrus contractus Casey, 1892
- Nicentrus convexulus Casey, 1920
- Nicentrus corumbanus Hustache, 1950
- Nicentrus cylindricollis Casey, 1920
- Nicentrus decemnotatus Champion & G.C., 1908
- Nicentrus decipiens (LeConte, 1876)
- Nicentrus densicollis Casey, 1922
- Nicentrus dentirostris Hustache, 1950
- Nicentrus effetus Casey, 1892
- Nicentrus egens Casey, 1922
- Nicentrus egenus Casey & T.L., 1922
- Nicentrus elegans Kuschel, 1983
- Nicentrus episternalis Hustache, 1950
- Nicentrus fallax Hustache, 1939
- Nicentrus falsus Kuschel, 1983
- Nicentrus fasciatus Hustache, 1950
- Nicentrus femoralis Champion & G.C., 1908
- Nicentrus fluminalis Casey, 1922
- Nicentrus forreri Champion & G.C., 1908
- Nicentrus fulvipes Champion & G.C., 1908
- Nicentrus grossulus Casey, 1893
- Nicentrus ingenuus Casey, 1892
- Nicentrus inops Kuschel, 1983
- Nicentrus interruptus Casey, 1922
- Nicentrus jekeli Hustache & A., 1938
- Nicentrus lateralis Casey, 1922
- Nicentrus lecontei Champion, 1908
- Nicentrus lineicollis (Boheman, 1844)
- Nicentrus lobatus Champion & G.C., 1908
- Nicentrus longithorax Hustache, 1950
- Nicentrus luteiventris Kuschel, 1983
- Nicentrus macilentus Champion & G.C., 1908
- Nicentrus medialis Casey, 1922
- Nicentrus montanus Casey, 1920
- Nicentrus napoanus Hustache, 1950
- Nicentrus neglectus Blatchley, 1916
- Nicentrus optivus Kuschel, 1983
- Nicentrus ordinatus Casey, 1920
- Nicentrus ornatus Casey, 1922
- Nicentrus ovulatus Casey, 1920
- Nicentrus parallelus Casey, 1920
- Nicentrus parensis Casey, 1920
- Nicentrus pertenuis Casey, 1920
- Nicentrus piceipes Casey, 1920
- Nicentrus pistorinus Casey, 1920
- Nicentrus placidus Champion & G.C., 1908
- Nicentrus puerilis Champion & G.C., 1908
- Nicentrus puritanus Casey, 1920
- Nicentrus robustus Hustache, 1950
- Nicentrus rubripes Casey, 1920
- Nicentrus saccharinus Marshall, 1952
- Nicentrus scitulus Casey, 1892
- Nicentrus semialbus Hustache, 1950
- Nicentrus serenus Casey, 1922
- Nicentrus signatulus Boheman & C.H., 1844
- Nicentrus silvestris Casey, 1922
- Nicentrus simulans Casey, 1920
- Nicentrus smithi Casey, 1922
- Nicentrus sodalis Casey, 1922
- Nicentrus striatopunctatus Casey, 1920
- Nicentrus subtubalatus Casey
- Nicentrus subtubulatus Casey, 1920
- Nicentrus suffusus Casey, 1922
- Nicentrus suturalis Hustache, 1950
- Nicentrus sylvestris Casey & T.L., 1922
- Nicentrus temerarius Hustache & A., 1938
- Nicentrus testaceipes Champion & G.C., 1908
- Nicentrus texensis Casey, 1920
- Nicentrus townsendi Casey, 1920
- Nicentrus towsendi Casey & T.L., 1920
- Nicentrus trilineatus Casey, 1920
- Nicentrus uniseriatus Casey, 1920
- Nicentrus vacunalis Casey, 1920
- Nicentrus viduatus Hustache, 1950
- Nicentrus wyandottei Blatchley, 1922
