= Diorymeropsis =

Scientific classification
- Domain: Eukaryota
- Kingdom: Animalia
- Phylum: Arthropoda
- Class: Insecta
- Order: Coleoptera
- Suborder: Polyphaga
- Infraorder: Cucujiformia
- Family: Curculionidae
- Tribe: Apostasimerini
- Genus: Diorymeropsis; Champion, 1908

Genus of beetles

Diorymeropsis is a genus of flower weevils in the beetle family Curculionidae. There are about 11 described species in Diorymeropsis.

== Species ==
These 11 species belong to the genus Diorymeropsis:

- Diorymeropsis cavimanus Champion & G.C., 1908
- Diorymeropsis disjunctus Champion & G.C., 1908
- Diorymeropsis dispersesquamulatus Hustache, 1950
- Diorymeropsis humilis Hustache, 1950
- Diorymeropsis irritus Kuschel, 1955
- Diorymeropsis lambitus Hustache & A., 1938
- Diorymeropsis obesulus Hustache & A., 1938
- Diorymeropsis piceicollis Champion & G.C., 1908
- Diorymeropsis uncatus Champion & G.C., 1908
- Diorymeropsis vanus Hustache & A., 1938
- Diorymeropsis xanthoxyli (Linell, 1897)
