= Plocamus hispidulus =

Scientific classification
- Kingdom: Animalia
- Phylum: Arthropoda
- Class: Insecta
- Order: Coleoptera
- Suborder: Polyphaga
- Infraorder: Cucujiformia
- Family: Curculionidae
- Genus: Plocamus
- Species: P. hispidulus

Binomial name
- Plocamus hispidulus LeConte, 1876

Species of beetle

Plocamus hispidulus is a species of flower weevil in the beetle family Curculionidae. It is found in North America.
