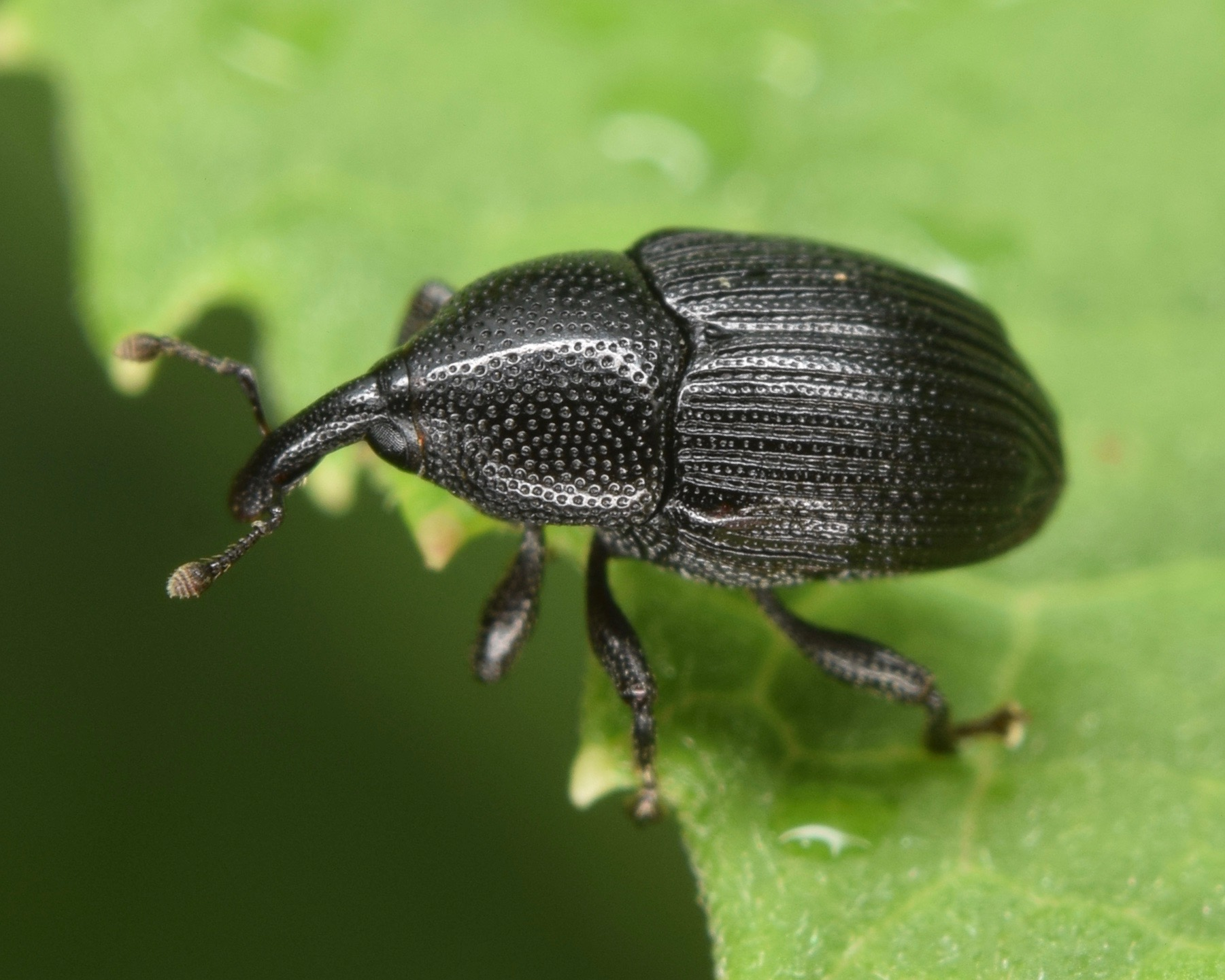

Scientific classification
- Domain: Eukaryota
- Kingdom: Animalia
- Phylum: Arthropoda
- Class: Insecta
- Order: Coleoptera
- Suborder: Polyphaga
- Infraorder: Cucujiformia
- Family: Curculionidae
- Genus: Stethobaris
- Species: S. ovata

Binomial name
- Stethobaris ovata (LeConte, 1869)

Synonyms
- Stethobaris congermana Casey, 1892; Stethobaris convergens Casey, 1920

= Stethobaris ovata =

Species of beetle

Stethobaris ovata is a species of flower weevil in the beetle family Curculionidae. It is found in North America.
