= Amercedes subulirostris =

Scientific classification
- Kingdom: Animalia
- Phylum: Arthropoda
- Class: Insecta
- Order: Coleoptera
- Suborder: Polyphaga
- Infraorder: Cucujiformia
- Family: Curculionidae
- Genus: Amercedes
- Species: A. subulirostris

Binomial name
- Amercedes subulirostris Casey, 1894

Synonyms
- Zygobaroides schwarzi Pierce, 1907

Species of weevil beetle

Amercedes subulirostris is a species of flower weevil in the beetle family Curculionidae. It is found in North America in Zanthoxylum foliage.
