= Sibariops =

Scientific classification
- Kingdom: Animalia
- Phylum: Arthropoda
- Class: Insecta
- Order: Coleoptera
- Suborder: Polyphaga
- Infraorder: Cucujiformia
- Family: Curculionidae
- Tribe: Apostasimerini
- Genus: Sibariops; Casey, 1920

Genus of beetles

Sibariops is a genus of flower weevils in the beetle family Curculionidae. There are more than 80 described species in Sibariops. The genus name is masculine, contrary to some sources, following ICZN Article 30.1.4.3: "A compound genus-group name ending in -ops is to be treated as masculine, regardless of its derivation or of its treatment by its author."

== Species ==
- Sibariops aeger Casey, 1920
- Sibariops alienus Hustache, 1938
- Sibariops amicus Casey, 1920
- Sibariops amnicola Casey, 1920
- Sibariops angustus Casey, 1922
- Sibariops ashevillensis Casey, 1920
- Sibariops astutus Hustache, 1938
- Sibariops austinianus Casey, 1920
- Sibariops bahiensis Bondar, 1943
- Sibariops benignus Casey, 1920
- Sibariops bifasciatus Bondar, 1943
- Sibariops brevipilis Hustache, 1950
- Sibariops breviscapa Hustache, 1938
- Sibariops caseyanus Bondar, 1943
- Sibariops castaneus Hustache, 1950
- Sibariops caudex Casey, 1920
- Sibariops civicus Casey, 1920
- Sibariops concinnus (LeConte, 1876)
- Sibariops concurrens (Casey, 1892)
- Sibariops confinis (LeConte, 1876)
- Sibariops confusus Boheman, 1836
- Sibariops convexulus Casey, 1920
- Sibariops corvinus Casey, 1920
- Sibariops curtulirostris Casey, 1920
- Sibariops definitus Casey, 1920
- Sibariops difficilis Casey, 1920
- Sibariops diffidens Casey, 1920
- Sibariops dubius Bondar, 1943
- Sibariops ebenus (Casey, 1892)
- Sibariops erebeus Casey, 1920
- Sibariops finitimus Casey, 1922
- Sibariops fraterculus (Casey, 1892)
- Sibariops fuirenae Bondar, 1943
- Sibariops fultonicus Casey, 1920
- Sibariops funereus Hustache, 1938
- Sibariops houstoni Casey, 1920
- Sibariops illinianus Casey, 1920
- Sibariops incolumis Casey, 1920
- Sibariops intermedius Casey, 1922
- Sibariops kansanus Casey, 1920
- Sibariops latipennis Casey, 1920
- Sibariops lepagei Bondar, 1943
- Sibariops levi Bondar, 1943
- Sibariops longipennis Casey, 1920
- Sibariops longithorax Hustache, 1939
- Sibariops lucidulus Casey, 1920
- Sibariops mediocris Casey, 1920
- Sibariops micans Casey, 1920
- Sibariops montei Bondar, 1943
- Sibariops mundulus Casey, 1920
- Sibariops nanellus Casey, 1920
- Sibariops nasutus Bondar, 1943
- Sibariops obesellus Casey, 1920
- Sibariops pedrito Bondar, 1943
- Sibariops pedritosilvai Bondar, 1943
- Sibariops pellax Blatchley, 1928
- Sibariops piceipes Casey, 1922
- Sibariops pilipennis Hustache, 1939
- Sibariops pistorellus Casey, 1922
- Sibariops praedatus Hustache, 1950
- Sibariops puncticollis Casey, 1922
- Sibariops pusillus Hustache, 1950
- Sibariops puteifera (Casey, 1892)
- Sibariops ramosi Bondar, 1943
- Sibariops rivularis Casey, 1920
- Sibariops rufipennis Bondar, 1943
- Sibariops sectator Casey, 1920
- Sibariops seminitens (Casey, 1892)
- Sibariops seminitidus Casey, 1920
- Sibariops similis Bondar, 1943
- Sibariops subtilis Casey, 1922
- Sibariops surrufipes Casey, 1920
- Sibariops tubifera Casey, 1920
- Sibariops uniseriatus Hustache, 1938
- Sibariops zikani Bondar, 1943
