= Idiostethus tubulatus =

Scientific classification
- Kingdom: Animalia
- Phylum: Arthropoda
- Class: Insecta
- Order: Coleoptera
- Suborder: Polyphaga
- Infraorder: Cucujiformia
- Family: Curculionidae
- Genus: Idiostethus
- Species: I. tubulatus

Binomial name
- Idiostethus tubulatus (Say, 1831)

Synonyms
- Pachybaris stigapunctus Hamilton, 1893

Species of beetle

Idiostethus tubulatus is a species of flower weevil in the beetle family Curculionidae. It is found in North America.
