= Zygobarella xanthoxyli =

Scientific classification
- Domain: Eukaryota
- Kingdom: Animalia
- Phylum: Arthropoda
- Class: Insecta
- Order: Coleoptera
- Suborder: Polyphaga
- Infraorder: Cucujiformia
- Family: Curculionidae
- Genus: Zygobarella
- Species: Z. xanthoxyli

Binomial name
- Zygobarella xanthoxyli (Pierce, 1907)

Species of beetle

Zygobarella xanthoxyli is a species of flower weevil in the beetle family Curculionidae. It is found in North America.
