= Centrinites =

Scientific classification
- Kingdom: Animalia
- Phylum: Arthropoda
- Class: Insecta
- Order: Coleoptera
- Suborder: Polyphaga
- Infraorder: Cucujiformia
- Family: Curculionidae
- Tribe: Apostasimerini
- Genus: Centrinites; Casey, 1892

Genus of beetles

Centrinites is a genus of flower weevils in the beetle family Curculionidae. There are about 19 described species in Centrinites.

== Species ==
These 19 species belong to the genus Centrinites:

- Centrinites audax Champion & G.C., 1908
- Centrinites boliviensis Hustache, 1950
- Centrinites colonus Kuschel, 1983
- Centrinites conicicollis Casey, 1922
- Centrinites dentimanus Champion & G.C., 1908
- Centrinites dissipatus Champion & G.C., 1908
- Centrinites egenus Casey, 1920
- Centrinites fuscipennis Casey, 1922
- Centrinites laticrus Champion & G.C., 1908
- Centrinites lineatulus Hustache, 1950
- Centrinites nanus Casey, 1922
- Centrinites ovoideus Casey, 1922
- Centrinites separatus Casey, 1922
- Centrinites setipennis Champion & G.C., 1908
- Centrinites solutus Kuschel, 1983
- Centrinites strigicollis Casey, 1892
- Centrinites submetallicus Hustache & A., 1938
- Centrinites t-flavum Champion & G.C., 1908
- Centrinites uniseriatus Champion & G.C., 1908
