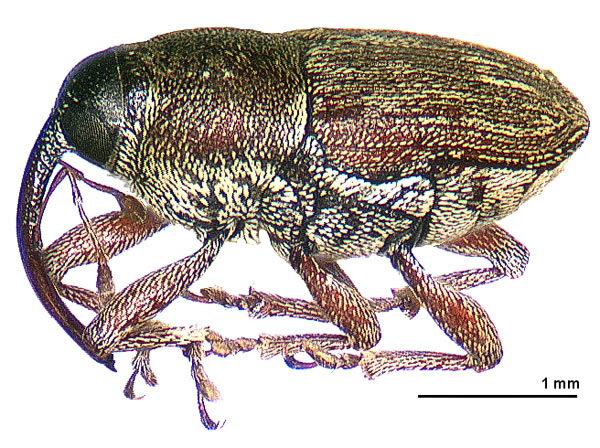

Scientific classification
- Kingdom: Animalia
- Phylum: Arthropoda
- Class: Insecta
- Order: Coleoptera
- Suborder: Polyphaga
- Infraorder: Cucujiformia
- Family: Curculionidae
- Tribe: Apostasimerini
- Genus: Linogeraeus; Casey, 1920

= Linogeraeus =

Genus of beetles

Linogeraeus is a genus of flower weevils in the family of beetles known as Curculionidae. There are at least 60 described species in Linogeraeus.

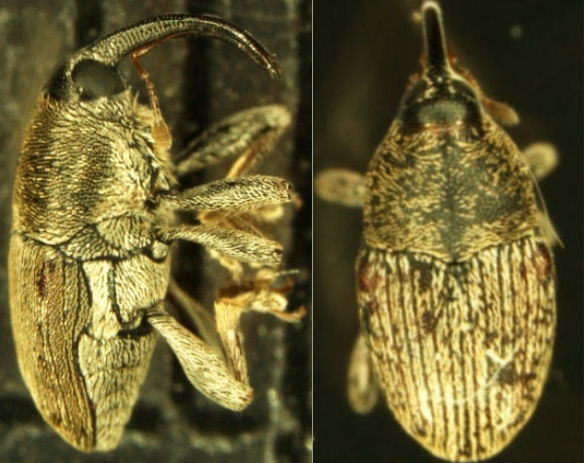

== Species ==
These 66 species belong to the genus Linogeraeus:

- Linogeraeus aequalis Kuschel, 1983^{c}
- Linogeraeus ancilla Kuschel, 1983^{c}
- Linogeraeus appalachensis Prena, 2009^{c}
- Linogeraeus bosqi Kuschel, 1983^{c}
- Linogeraeus brevicollis Kuschel, 1983^{c}
- Linogeraeus bucolicus Kuschel, 1983^{c}
- Linogeraeus capillatus (Le Conte, 1876)^{c b}
- Linogeraeus clarescens Kuschel, 1983^{c}
- Linogeraeus clientulus Kuschel, 1983^{c}
- Linogeraeus convexus Kuschel, 1983^{c}
- Linogeraeus crucifer Prena, 2009^{c}
- Linogeraeus devinctus Kuschel, 1983^{c}
- Linogeraeus expansus Kuschel, 1983^{c}
- Linogeraeus fausti Kuschel, 1983^{c}
- Linogeraeus finitimus^{c b}
- Linogeraeus furtivus Kuschel, 1983^{c}
- Linogeraeus geayi Kuschel, 1983^{c}
- Linogeraeus grisescens Kuschel, 1983^{c}
- Linogeraeus hilaris Kuschel, 1983^{c}
- Linogeraeus hospes Kuschel, 1983^{c}
- Linogeraeus intritus Kuschel, 1983^{c}
- Linogeraeus laevicollis Kuschel, 1983^{c}
- Linogeraeus laevirostris^{c b}
- Linogeraeus laticollis Kuschel, 1983^{c}
- Linogeraeus lentiginosus Kuschel, 1983^{c}
- Linogeraeus lineellus Casey, 1920^{c}
- Linogeraeus merens Casey, 1920^{c}
- Linogeraeus meritus Kuschel, 1983^{c}
- Linogeraeus nactus Kuschel, 1983^{c}
- Linogeraeus neglectus^{c b}
- Linogeraeus nemorosus Kuschel, 1983^{c}
- Linogeraeus nubecula Kuschel, 1983^{c}
- Linogeraeus obnixus Kuschel, 1983^{c}
- Linogeraeus obscurus Kuschel, 1983^{c}
- Linogeraeus ohausi Kuschel, 1983^{c}
- Linogeraeus opicus Kuschel, 1983^{c}
- Linogeraeus parabilis Kuschel, 1983^{c}
- Linogeraeus pernotus Kuschel, 1983^{c}
- Linogeraeus perscitus (Herbst & J.F.W., 1797)^{c g b}
- Linogeraeus pictulus Kuschel, 1983^{c}
- Linogeraeus picturatus Kuschel, 1983^{c}
- Linogeraeus pictus Kuschel, 1983^{c}
- Linogeraeus polylineatus Kuschel, 1983^{c}
- Linogeraeus postmaculatus Kuschel, 1983^{c}
- Linogeraeus praevaricatus Kuschel, 1983^{c}
- Linogeraeus propinquus Kuschel, 1983^{c}
- Linogeraeus proximus Kuschel, 1983^{c}
- Linogeraeus quadrivittatus Kuschel, 1983^{c}
- Linogeraeus repens Kuschel, 1983^{c}
- Linogeraeus rivularis Kuschel, 1983^{c}
- Linogeraeus seductus Kuschel, 1983^{c}
- Linogeraeus segregans Kuschel, 1983^{c}
- Linogeraeus similis Kuschel, 1983^{c}
- Linogeraeus simiolus Kuschel, 1983^{c}
- Linogeraeus spiniger Kuschel, 1983^{c}
- Linogeraeus squamirostris Prena, 2009^{c}
- Linogeraeus tenuiculus Kuschel, 1983^{c}
- Linogeraeus testatus Kuschel, 1983^{c}
- Linogeraeus tetrastigma Champion, G.C., 1908^{c}
- Linogeraeus tonsilis^{c b}
- Linogeraeus tonsus Prena, 2009^{c}
- Linogeraeus trivittatus Casey, T.L., 1920^{c}
- Linogeraeus venezolanus Kuschel, 1983^{c}
- Linogeraeus vernalis Kuschel, 1983^{c}
- Linogeraeus vianai Kuschel, 1983^{c}
- Linogeraeus x-albus Kuschel, 1983^{c}

Data sources: i = ITIS, c = Catalogue of Life, g = GBIF, b = Bugguide.net
