= Oligolochus ornatus =

Scientific classification
- Kingdom: Animalia
- Phylum: Arthropoda
- Class: Insecta
- Order: Coleoptera
- Suborder: Polyphaga
- Infraorder: Cucujiformia
- Family: Curculionidae
- Genus: Oligolochus
- Species: O. ornatus

Binomial name
- Oligolochus ornatus (Casey, 1920)

Species of beetle

Oligolochus ornatus is a species of flower weevil in the beetle family Curculionidae.
