= Diorymeropsis xanthoxyli =

Scientific classification
- Domain: Eukaryota
- Kingdom: Animalia
- Phylum: Arthropoda
- Class: Insecta
- Order: Coleoptera
- Suborder: Polyphaga
- Infraorder: Cucujiformia
- Family: Curculionidae
- Genus: Diorymeropsis
- Species: D. xanthoxyli

Binomial name
- Diorymeropsis xanthoxyli (Linell, 1897)

Species of beetle

Diorymeropsis xanthoxyli is a species of flower weevil in the beetle family Curculionidae. It is found in North America.
