= Haplostethops gravidulus =

Scientific classification
- Kingdom: Animalia
- Phylum: Arthropoda
- Class: Insecta
- Order: Coleoptera
- Suborder: Polyphaga
- Infraorder: Cucujiformia
- Family: Curculionidae
- Genus: Haplostethops
- Species: H. gravidulus

Binomial name
- Haplostethops gravidulus Casey, 1920

Species of beetle

Haplostethops gravidulus is a species of flower weevil in the beetle family Curculionidae. It is found in North America.
