= Calandrinus grandicollis =

Scientific classification
- Kingdom: Animalia
- Phylum: Arthropoda
- Class: Insecta
- Order: Coleoptera
- Suborder: Polyphaga
- Infraorder: Cucujiformia
- Family: Curculionidae
- Genus: Calandrinus
- Species: C. grandicollis

Binomial name
- Calandrinus grandicollis LeConte, 1876

Synonyms
- Calandrinus angustulus Casey, 1920

Species of beetle

Calandrinus grandicollis is a species of flower weevil in the beetle family Curculionidae. It is found in North America.
