= Plocamus =

Scientific classification
- Kingdom: Animalia
- Phylum: Arthropoda
- Class: Insecta
- Order: Coleoptera
- Suborder: Polyphaga
- Infraorder: Cucujiformia
- Family: Curculionidae
- Tribe: Apostasimerini
- Genus: Plocamus; LeConte, 1876

Genus of beetles

Plocamus is a genus of flower weevils in the beetle family Curculionidae. There are about nine described species in Plocamus.

== Species ==
These nine species belong to the genus Plocamus:

- Plocamus albofasciatus Hustache, 1950
- Plocamus apicalis Hustache, 1950
- Plocamus bellus Hustache, 1950
- Plocamus brevisetis Hustache, 1950
- Plocamus clavisetis Champion & G.C., 1908
- Plocamus echidna (LeConte, 1876) (porcupine weevil)
- Plocamus hispidulus LeConte, 1876
- Plocamus hystrix Champion & G.C., 1908
- Plocamus variegatus Hustache, 1950
