= Zygobarella =

Scientific classification
- Kingdom: Animalia
- Phylum: Arthropoda
- Class: Insecta
- Order: Coleoptera
- Suborder: Polyphaga
- Infraorder: Cucujiformia
- Family: Curculionidae
- Tribe: Apostasimerini
- Genus: Zygobarella; Casey, 1920

Genus of beetles

Zygobarella is a genus of flower weevils in the beetle family Curculionidae. There are at least two described species in Zygobarella.

== Species ==
These two species belong to the genus Zygobarella:

- Zygobarella tristicula Casey & T.L., 1920
- Zygobarella xanthoxyli (Pierce, 1907)
