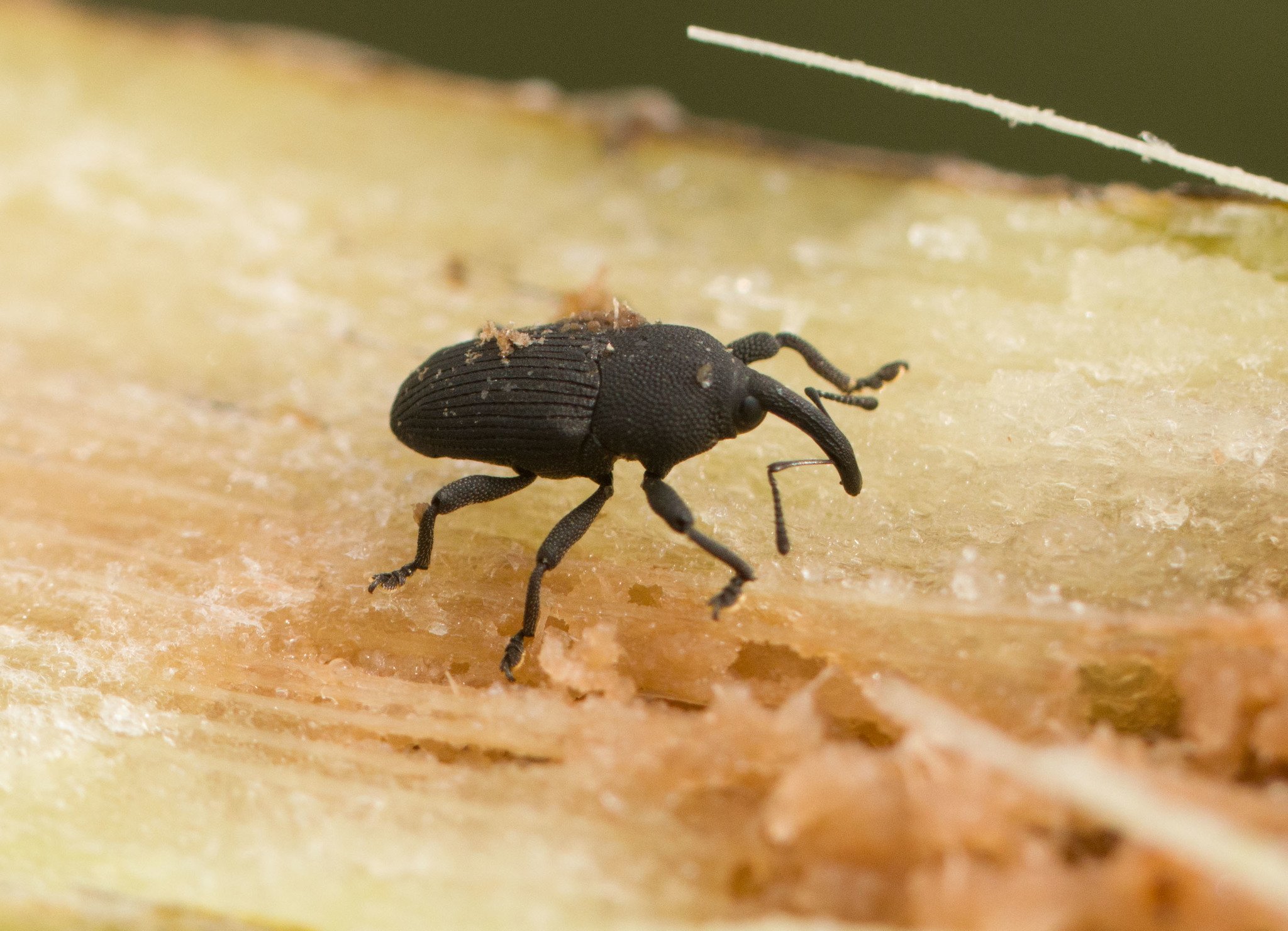
- Orchidophilus aterrimus in Honolulu

Scientific classification
- Kingdom: Animalia
- Phylum: Arthropoda
- Class: Insecta
- Order: Coleoptera
- Suborder: Polyphaga
- Infraorder: Cucujiformia
- Family: Curculionidae
- Genus: Orchidophilus
- Species: O. aterrimus

Binomial name
- Orchidophilus aterrimus (Waterhouse, 1874)

= Orchidophilus aterrimus =

Species of beetle

Orchidophilus aterrimus, the orchid weevil, is a species of flower weevil in the beetle family Curculionidae.
