= Cylindridia =

Scientific classification
- Kingdom: Animalia
- Phylum: Arthropoda
- Class: Insecta
- Order: Coleoptera
- Suborder: Polyphaga
- Infraorder: Cucujiformia
- Family: Curculionidae
- Tribe: Apostasimerini
- Genus: Cylindridia; Casey, 1920

Genus of beetles

Cylindridia is a genus of flower weevils in the beetle family Curculionidae, with currently seven valid names included. The species occur from Canada to Argentina.

== Species ==
- Cylindridia andersoni Prena, 2012
- Cylindridia fuscipes Prena, 2006
- Cylindridia latisquama Prena, 2012
- Cylindridia prolixa (LeConte, 1876)
- Cylindridia propinqua Prena, 2006
- Cylindridia rubripes Prena, 2006
- Cylindridia sanguinea (Hustache, 1939)

No longer valid (all junior subjective synonyms of C. prolixa):

- Cylindridia nitidissima (Casey, 1892)
- Cylindridia perexilis Casey, 1920
- Cylindridia simulator Casey, 1920

== Biology ==
At least four species develop in the culm of Cyperaceae.
