= Oligolochus bracatus =

Scientific classification
- Kingdom: Animalia
- Phylum: Arthropoda
- Class: Insecta
- Order: Coleoptera
- Suborder: Polyphaga
- Infraorder: Cucujiformia
- Family: Curculionidae
- Genus: Oligolochus
- Species: O. bracatus

Binomial name
- Oligolochus bracatus (Casey, 1892)

Synonyms
- Oligolochus robustus Linell, 1897

Species of beetle

Oligolochus bracatus is a species of flower weevil in the beetle family Curculionidae.
