= Buchananius =

Scientific classification
- Domain: Eukaryota
- Kingdom: Animalia
- Phylum: Arthropoda
- Class: Insecta
- Order: Coleoptera
- Suborder: Polyphaga
- Infraorder: Cucujiformia
- Family: Curculionidae
- Tribe: Apostasimerini
- Genus: Buchananius; Kissinger, 1957

Genus of beetles

Buchananius is a genus of flower weevils in the beetle family Curculionidae. There are nine described species in Buchananius.

== Species ==
- Buchananius carinifer Kissinger, 1957
- Buchananius costatus Kissinger, 1957
- Buchananius crispus Kissinger, 1957
- Buchananius minutissimus Kissinger, 1957
- Buchananius neglectus Kissinger, 1957
- Buchananius quadriguttatus Kissinger, 1957
- Buchananius seriatus Kissinger, 1957
- Buchananius striatus (LeConte, 1876)
- Buchananius sulcatus (LeConte, 1876)
