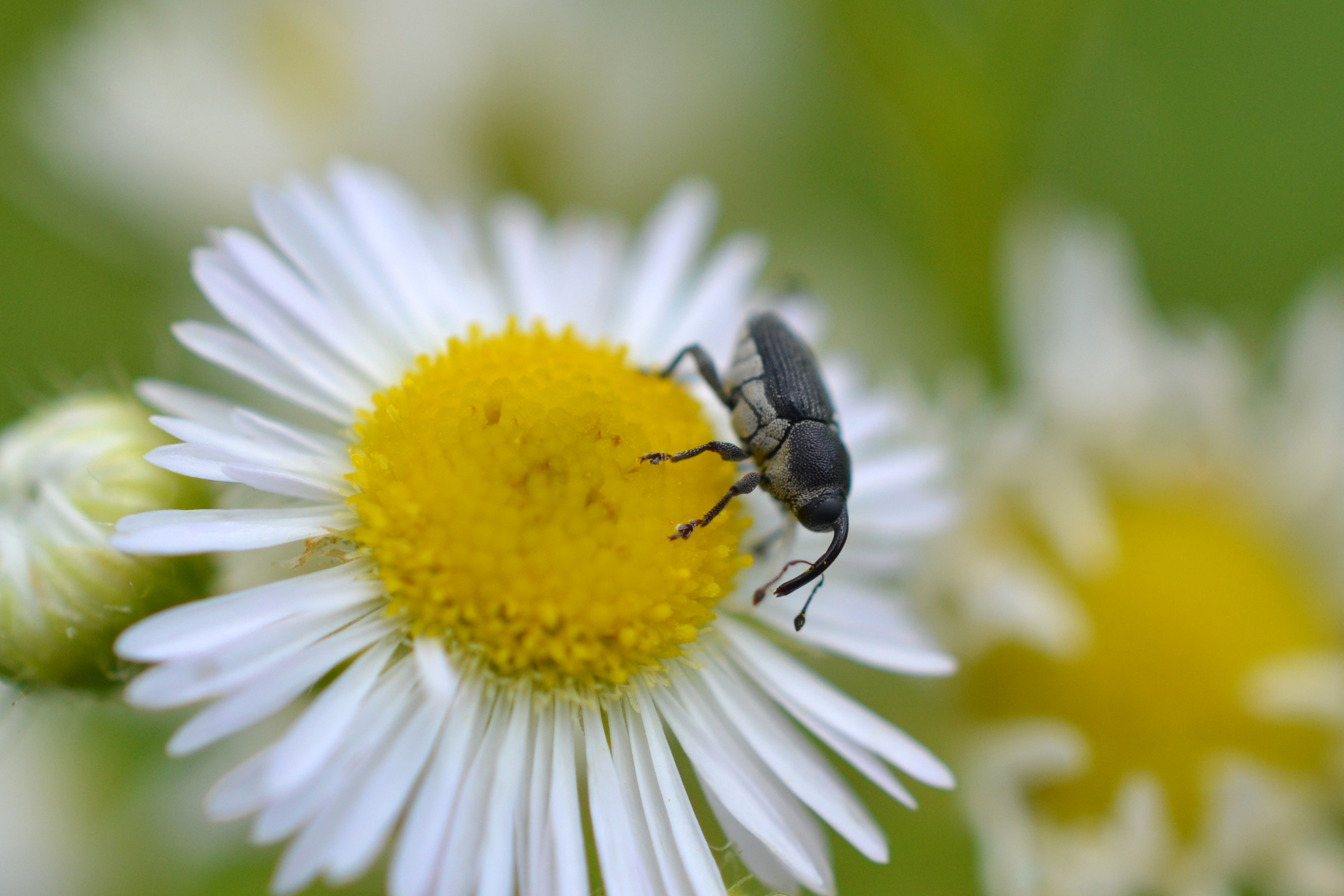

Scientific classification
- Domain: Eukaryota
- Kingdom: Animalia
- Phylum: Arthropoda
- Class: Insecta
- Order: Coleoptera
- Suborder: Polyphaga
- Infraorder: Cucujiformia
- Family: Curculionidae
- Genus: Odontocorynus
- Species: O. umbellae

Binomial name
- Odontocorynus umbellae (Fabricius, 1801)

Synonyms
- Centrinus scutellumalbum Say, 1832; O. adjunctus Casey, 1920; O. advenus Casey, 1920; O. amazonicus Casey, 1922; O. amputatus Casey, 1920; O. atokanus Casey, 1920; O. divisus Casey, 1920; O. fluviatilis Casey, 1922; O. fultoni Casey, 1920; O. glabellus Casey, 1922; O. illini Casey, 1920; O. incertus Casey, 1920; O. lineatellus Casey, 1920; O. rufobrunneus Casey, 1920; O. semiruber Casey, 1920; O. subabruptus Casey, 1920; O. subaffinis Casey, 1920; O. unilineatus Casey, 1920

= Odontocorynus umbellae =

Species of beetle

Odontocorynus umbellae is a species in the weevil family.

== Description ==
Odontocorynus umbellae either have a brown or black coloring. Adults grow up to 3–5 millimetres (0.12–0.20 in). The rostrum of the species is heavily curved at the base, but almost straight under the apex.

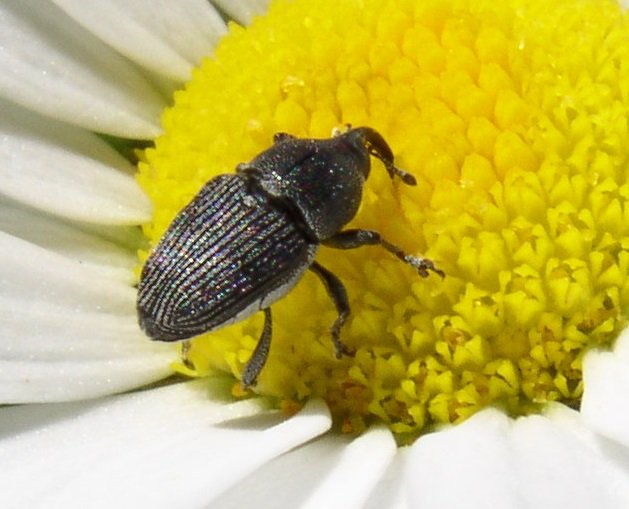

== Ecology ==
Adults consume flowers among of which are the Common Mullein, daisies, and sunflowers. They are active from May–September.
