= Barilepis =

Scientific classification
- Kingdom: Animalia
- Phylum: Arthropoda
- Class: Insecta
- Order: Coleoptera
- Suborder: Polyphaga
- Infraorder: Cucujiformia
- Family: Curculionidae
- Tribe: Apostasimerini
- Genus: Barilepis; Casey, 1920

Genus of beetles

Barilepis is a genus of flower weevils in the beetle family Curculionidae. There are at least four described species in Barilepis.

== Species ==
These four species belong to the genus Barilepis:

- Barilepis apacheana Casey, 1920
- Barilepis grisea (LeConte, 1876)
- Barilepis griseus Casey, T.L., 1920
- Barilepis virginica Casey, 1920
