= Plocamus echidna =

Scientific classification
- Kingdom: Animalia
- Phylum: Arthropoda
- Class: Insecta
- Order: Coleoptera
- Suborder: Polyphaga
- Infraorder: Cucujiformia
- Family: Curculionidae
- Genus: Plocamus
- Species: P. echidna

Binomial name
- Plocamus echidna (LeConte, 1876)

Species of beetle

Plocamus echidna, the porcupine weevil, is a species of flower weevil in the beetle family Curculionidae. It is found in North America.
