= Idiostethus subcalvus =

Scientific classification
- Kingdom: Animalia
- Phylum: Arthropoda
- Class: Insecta
- Order: Coleoptera
- Suborder: Polyphaga
- Infraorder: Cucujiformia
- Family: Curculionidae
- Genus: Idiostethus
- Species: I. subcalvus

Binomial name
- Idiostethus subcalvus (LeConte, 1878)

Species of beetle

Idiostethus subcalvus is a species of flower weevil in the beetle family Curculionidae. It is found in North America.
