= Buchananius striatus =

Scientific classification
- Kingdom: Animalia
- Phylum: Arthropoda
- Class: Insecta
- Order: Coleoptera
- Suborder: Polyphaga
- Infraorder: Cucujiformia
- Family: Curculionidae
- Genus: Buchananius
- Species: B. striatus

Binomial name
- Buchananius striatus (LeConte, 1876)

Synonyms
- Zaglyptus atomicus Casey, 1920; Zaglyptus perminutus Casey, 1920

Species of beetle

Buchananius striatus is a species of flower weevil in the family of beetles known as Curculionidae. It is found in North America.
