= Pachybaris =

Scientific classification
- Kingdom: Animalia
- Phylum: Arthropoda
- Class: Insecta
- Order: Coleoptera
- Suborder: Polyphaga
- Infraorder: Cucujiformia
- Family: Curculionidae
- Tribe: Apostasimerini
- Genus: Pachybaris; LeConte, 1876

Genus of beetles

Pachybaris is a genus of flower weevils in the beetle family Curculionidae. There are about five described species in Pachybaris.

== Species ==
These five species belong to the genus Pachybaris:

- Pachybaris ludoviciana Casey, 1920
- Pachybaris porosa LeConte, 1876
- Pachybaris rudis Wickham, 1912
- Pachybaris stolida Faust & J., 1896
- Pachybaris xanthoxyli Linell
