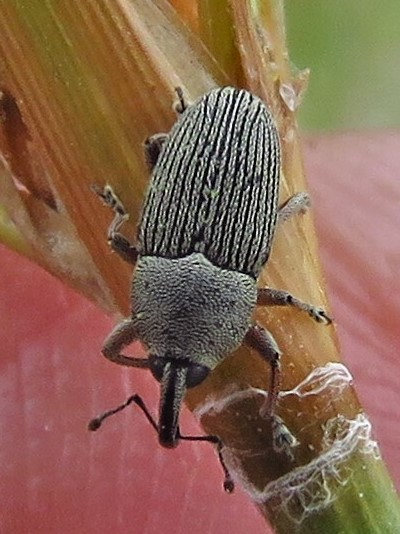

Scientific classification
- Kingdom: Animalia
- Phylum: Arthropoda
- Clade: Pancrustacea
- Class: Insecta
- Order: Coleoptera
- Suborder: Polyphaga
- Infraorder: Cucujiformia
- Family: Curculionidae
- Genus: Nicentrus
- Species: N. decipiens

Binomial name
- Nicentrus decipiens (LeConte, 1876)

= Nicentrus decipiens =

Species of beetle

Nicentrus decipiens is a species of flower weevil in the beetle family Curculionidae. It is found in North America.
