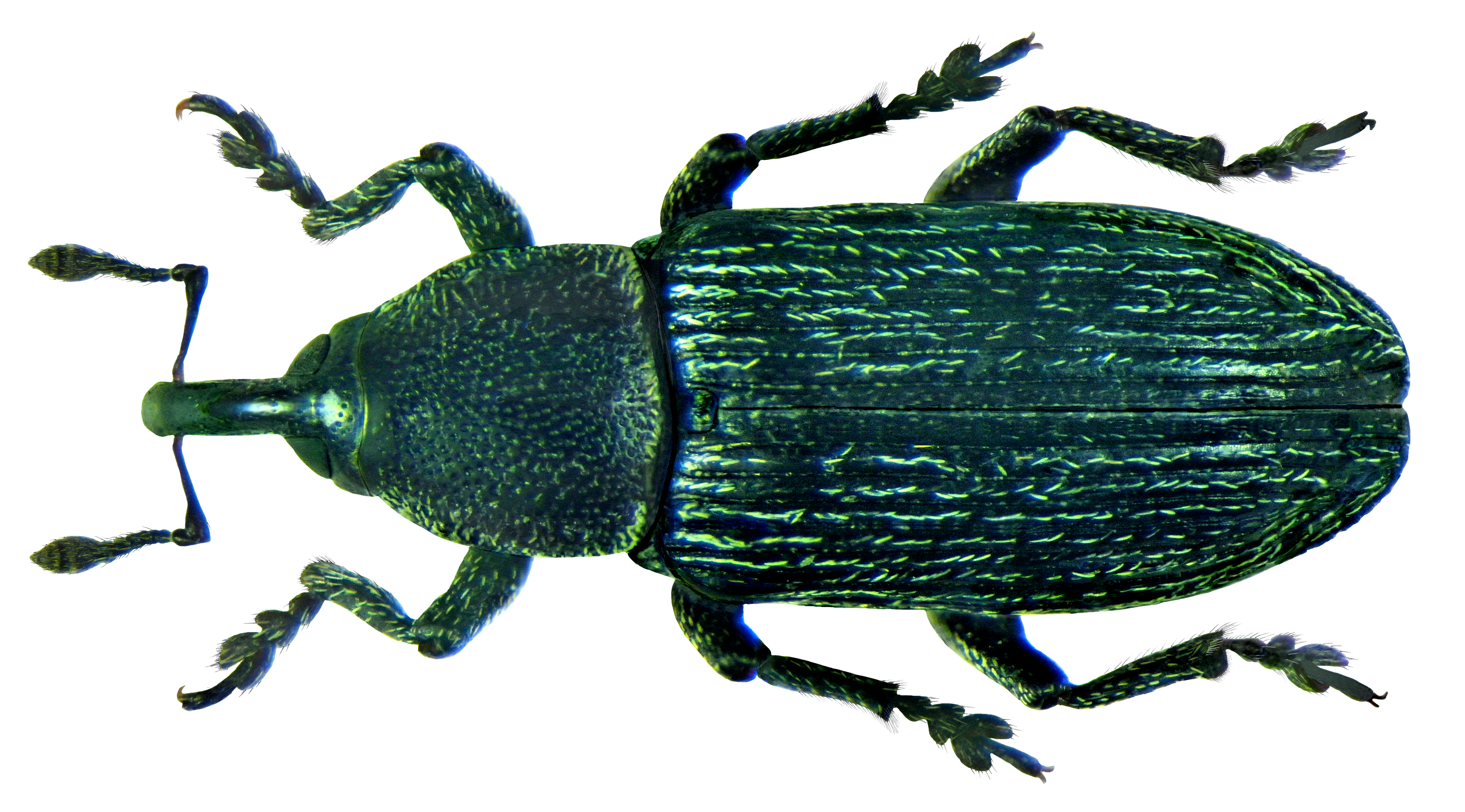
- Limnobaris dolorosa 4 mm (2,8-4,5 mm)

Scientific classification
- Kingdom: Animalia
- Phylum: Arthropoda
- Clade: Pancrustacea
- Class: Insecta
- Order: Coleoptera
- Suborder: Polyphaga
- Infraorder: Cucujiformia
- Superfamily: Curculionoidea
- Family: Curculionidae
- Genus: Limnobaris
- Species: L. dolorosa

Binomial name
- Limnobaris dolorosa (Goeze, 1777)

= Limnobaris dolorosa =

Species of beetle

Limnobaris dolorosa is a species of weevil native to Europe.

Its size lies between 2,8 and 4,5 mm.

== Taxonomy ==
Limnobaris dolorosa belongs to the family Curculionidae.

== Distribution ==
It lives in Austria, Schladminger Tauern, Mariapfarr on the plants Cyperaceae and Juncaceae.

== Sources ==
"Käfer der Welt" (beetles of the world) https://www.kaefer-der-welt.de/limnobaris_dolorosa.htm
