= Nicentrus saccharinus =

Scientific classification
- Domain: Eukaryota
- Kingdom: Animalia
- Phylum: Arthropoda
- Class: Insecta
- Order: Coleoptera
- Suborder: Polyphaga
- Infraorder: Cucujiformia
- Family: Curculionidae
- Genus: Nicentrus
- Species: N. saccharinus

Binomial name
- Nicentrus saccharinus Marshall, 1952

Species of beetle

Nicentrus saccharinus is a species of flower weevil in the beetle family Curculionidae. It is found in North America.
