= Eisonyx crassipes =

Scientific classification
- Kingdom: Animalia
- Phylum: Arthropoda
- Class: Insecta
- Order: Coleoptera
- Suborder: Polyphaga
- Infraorder: Cucujiformia
- Family: Curculionidae
- Genus: Eisonyx
- Species: E. crassipes

Binomial name
- Eisonyx crassipes LeConte, 1880

Species of beetle

Eisonyx crassipes is a species of flower weevil in the beetle family Curculionidae. It is found in North America.
