= Oomorphidius =

Scientific classification
- Kingdom: Animalia
- Phylum: Arthropoda
- Class: Insecta
- Order: Coleoptera
- Suborder: Polyphaga
- Infraorder: Cucujiformia
- Family: Curculionidae
- Tribe: Apostasimerini
- Genus: Oomorphidius; Casey, 1892

Genus of beetles

Oomorphidius is a genus of flower weevils in the beetle family Curculionidae. There are at least two described species in Oomorphidius.

== Species ==
These two species belong to the genus Oomorphidius:

- Oomorphidius erasus (LeConte, 1880)
- Oomorphidius laevicollis (LeConte, 1876)
