= Amercedes =

Scientific classification
- Kingdom: Animalia
- Phylum: Arthropoda
- Class: Insecta
- Order: Coleoptera
- Suborder: Polyphaga
- Infraorder: Cucujiformia
- Family: Curculionidae
- Tribe: Apostasimerini
- Genus: Amercedes; Casey, 1894

Genus of beetles

Amercedes is a genus of flower weevils in the beetle family Curculionidae. There are at least three described species in Amercedes.

== Species ==
These three species belong to the genus Amercedes:

- Amercedes orthorrhinus Champion & G.C., 1909
- Amercedes schwarzi Hustache & A., 1938
- Amercedes subulirostris Casey, 1894
