= Centrinogyna =

Scientific classification
- Kingdom: Animalia
- Phylum: Arthropoda
- Class: Insecta
- Order: Coleoptera
- Suborder: Polyphaga
- Infraorder: Cucujiformia
- Family: Curculionidae
- Tribe: Apostasimerini
- Genus: Centrinogyna; Casey, 1892

Genus of beetles

Centrinogyna is a genus of flower weevils in the beetle family Curculionidae. There are about six described species in Centrinogyna.

== Species ==
These six species belong to the genus Centrinogyna:

- Centrinogyna canadensis Casey, 1920
- Centrinogyna hispidula Casey, 1920
- Centrinogyna laramiensis Casey, 1920
- Centrinogyna procera Casey, 1892
- Centrinogyna strigata (LeConte, 1876)
- Centrinogyna subaequalis Casey, 1920
