= Oomorphidius laevicollis =

Scientific classification
- Kingdom: Animalia
- Phylum: Arthropoda
- Class: Insecta
- Order: Coleoptera
- Suborder: Polyphaga
- Infraorder: Cucujiformia
- Family: Curculionidae
- Genus: Oomorphidius
- Species: O. laevicollis

Binomial name
- Oomorphidius laevicollis (LeConte, 1876)

Species of beetle

Oomorphidius laevicollis is a species of flower weevil in the beetle family Curculionidae. It is found in North America.
