= Barilepton =

Scientific classification
- Kingdom: Animalia
- Phylum: Arthropoda
- Class: Insecta
- Order: Coleoptera
- Suborder: Polyphaga
- Infraorder: Cucujiformia
- Family: Curculionidae
- Tribe: Apostasimerini
- Genus: Barilepton; LeConte, 1876

Genus of beetles

Barilepton is a genus of flower weevils in the beetle family Curculionidae. There are about 13 described species in Barilepton.

== Species ==
These 13 species belong to the genus Barilepton:

- Barilepton albescens LeConte & J.L., 1880
- Barilepton bivittatus LeConte & J.L
- Barilepton cribricollis LeConte & J.L., 1876
- Barilepton falciger Casey, 1892
- Barilepton famelicum Casey, 1892
- Barilepton filiforme LeConte, 1876
- Barilepton grandicollis LeConte & J.L., 1876
- Barilepton linearis LeConte & J.L., 1876
- Barilepton lutescens LeConte & J.L., 1880
- Barilepton productum Casey, 1920
- Barilepton quadricolle LeConte, 1876
- Barilepton robusta Blatchley, 1920
- Barilepton robustus Fall & H.C.
