= Dirabius rectirostris =

Scientific classification
- Domain: Eukaryota
- Kingdom: Animalia
- Phylum: Arthropoda
- Class: Insecta
- Order: Coleoptera
- Suborder: Polyphaga
- Infraorder: Cucujiformia
- Family: Curculionidae
- Genus: Dirabius
- Species: D. rectirostris

Binomial name
- Dirabius rectirostris (LeConte, 1876)

Synonyms
- Limnobaris tenua Blatchley, 1916

Species of beetle

Dirabius rectirostris is a species of flower weevil in the beetle family Curculionidae. It is found in North America.
