= Centrinogyna procera =

Scientific classification
- Kingdom: Animalia
- Phylum: Arthropoda
- Class: Insecta
- Order: Coleoptera
- Suborder: Polyphaga
- Infraorder: Cucujiformia
- Family: Curculionidae
- Genus: Centrinogyna
- Species: C. procera

Binomial name
- Centrinogyna procera Casey, 1892

Species of beetle

Centrinogyna procera is a species of flower weevil in the beetle family Curculionidae. It is found in North America.
