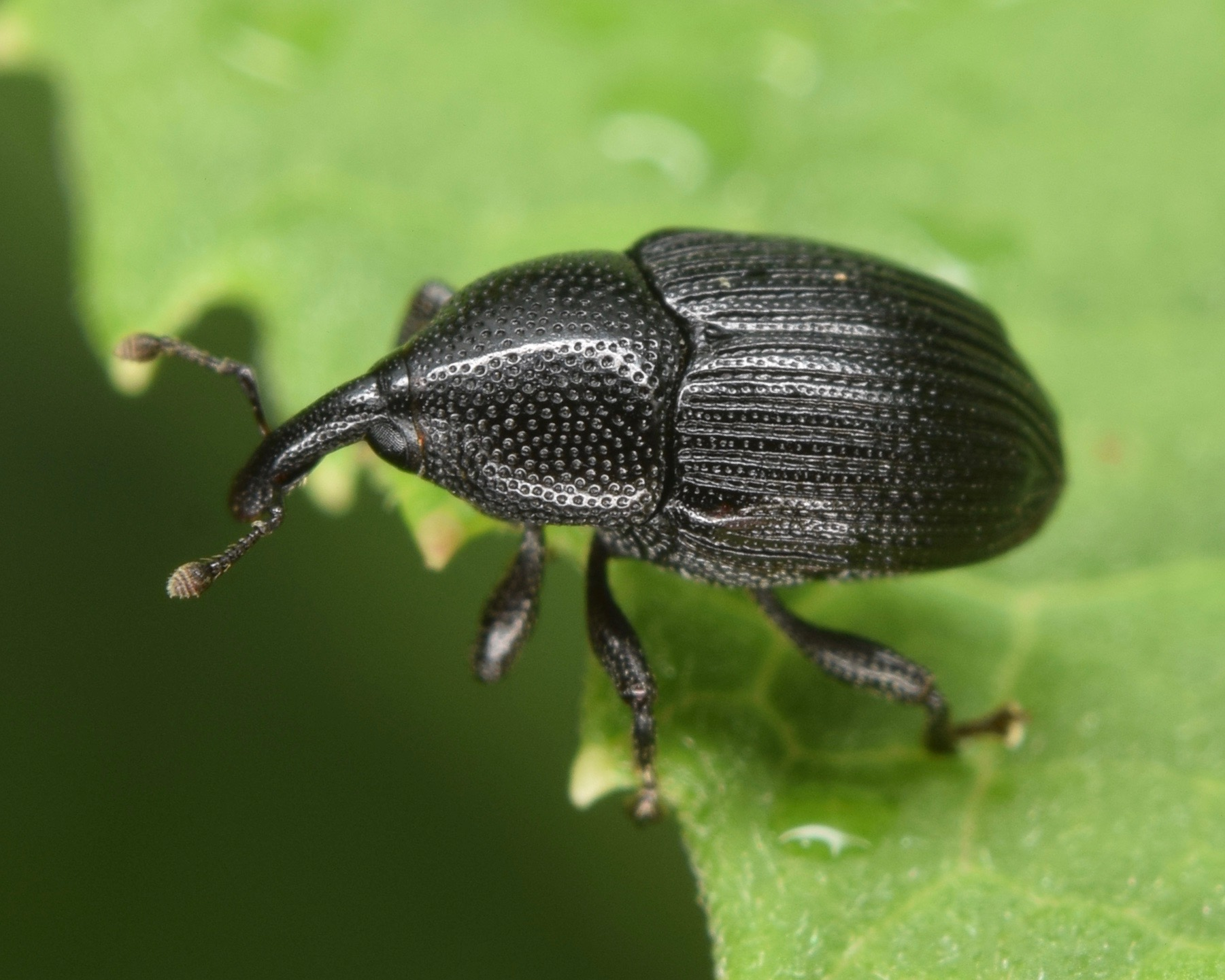
- Stethobaris ovata

Scientific classification
- Kingdom: Animalia
- Phylum: Arthropoda
- Class: Insecta
- Order: Coleoptera
- Suborder: Polyphaga
- Infraorder: Cucujiformia
- Family: Curculionidae
- Tribe: Apostasimerini
- Genus: Stethobaris; LeConte, 1876

Synonyms
- Diorymerellus Champion, 1908

= Stethobaris =

Genus of beetles

Stethobaris is a genus of flower weevils in the beetle family Curculionidae. There are about 25 described species in Stethobaris.

== Species ==
These 16 species have been found in North America:

- Stethobaris arizonica Casey, 1920
- Stethobaris cerpheroides Prena & O'Brien, 2011
- Stethobaris cicatricosa Casey, 1893
- Stethobaris collaris Casey, 1920
- Stethobaris corpulenta LeConte, 1876
- Stethobaris egregia Casey, 1892
- Stethobaris hybris Prena & O'Brien, 2011
- Stethobaris incompta Casey, 1892
- Stethobaris laevimargo (Champion, 1916)
- Stethobaris nemesis Prena & O'Brien, 2011
- Stethobaris ovata (LeConte, 1868)
- Stethobaris polita (Chevrolat, 1880)
- Stethobaris rufescens Prena & O'Brien, 2011
- Stethobaris sacajaweae Prena, 2017
- Stethobaris sprekeliae Prena & O'Brien, 2011
- Stethobaris ultima Prena & O'Brien, 2011
