= Odontocorynus larvatus =

Scientific classification
- Kingdom: Animalia
- Phylum: Arthropoda
- Class: Insecta
- Order: Coleoptera
- Suborder: Polyphaga
- Infraorder: Cucujiformia
- Family: Curculionidae
- Genus: Odontocorynus
- Species: O. larvatus

Binomial name
- Odontocorynus larvatus (Boheman, 1844)

Synonyms
- Nicentrus contractus Casey, 1892

Species of beetle

Odontocorynus larvatus is a species of flower weevil in the beetle family Curculionidae. It is found in North America.
