= Stethobaris cicatricosa =

Scientific classification
- Kingdom: Animalia
- Phylum: Arthropoda
- Class: Insecta
- Order: Coleoptera
- Suborder: Polyphaga
- Infraorder: Cucujiformia
- Family: Curculionidae
- Genus: Stethobaris
- Species: S. cicatricosa

Binomial name
- Stethobaris cicatricosa Casey, 1893

Species of beetle

Stethobaris cicatricosa is a species of flower weevil in the beetle family Curculionidae. It is found in North America.
