= Trichodirabius =

Scientific classification
- Kingdom: Animalia
- Phylum: Arthropoda
- Class: Insecta
- Order: Coleoptera
- Suborder: Polyphaga
- Infraorder: Cucujiformia
- Family: Curculionidae
- Tribe: Apostasimerini
- Genus: Trichodirabius; Casey, 1920

Genus of beetles

Trichodirabius is a genus of flower weevils in the beetle family Curculionidae. There are at least four described species in Trichodirabius.

== Species ==
These four species belong to the genus Trichodirabius:

- Trichodirabius canus (LeConte, 1876)
- Trichodirabius industus Casey
- Trichodirabius indutus Casey, 1920
- Trichodirabius longulus (LeConte, 1876)
