= Oomorphidius erasus =

Scientific classification
- Kingdom: Animalia
- Phylum: Arthropoda
- Class: Insecta
- Order: Coleoptera
- Suborder: Polyphaga
- Infraorder: Cucujiformia
- Family: Curculionidae
- Genus: Oomorphidius
- Species: O. erasus

Binomial name
- Oomorphidius erasus (LeConte, 1880)

Species of beetle

Oomorphidius erasus is a species of flower weevil in the beetle family Curculionidae. It is found in North America.
