= Pachybaris porosa =

Scientific classification
- Kingdom: Animalia
- Phylum: Arthropoda
- Class: Insecta
- Order: Coleoptera
- Suborder: Polyphaga
- Infraorder: Cucujiformia
- Family: Curculionidae
- Genus: Pachybaris
- Species: P. porosa

Binomial name
- Pachybaris porosa LeConte, 1876

Synonyms
- Pachybaris ludoviciana Casey, 1920

Species of beetle

Pachybaris porosa is a species of flower weevil in the beetle family Curculionidae. It is found in North America.
