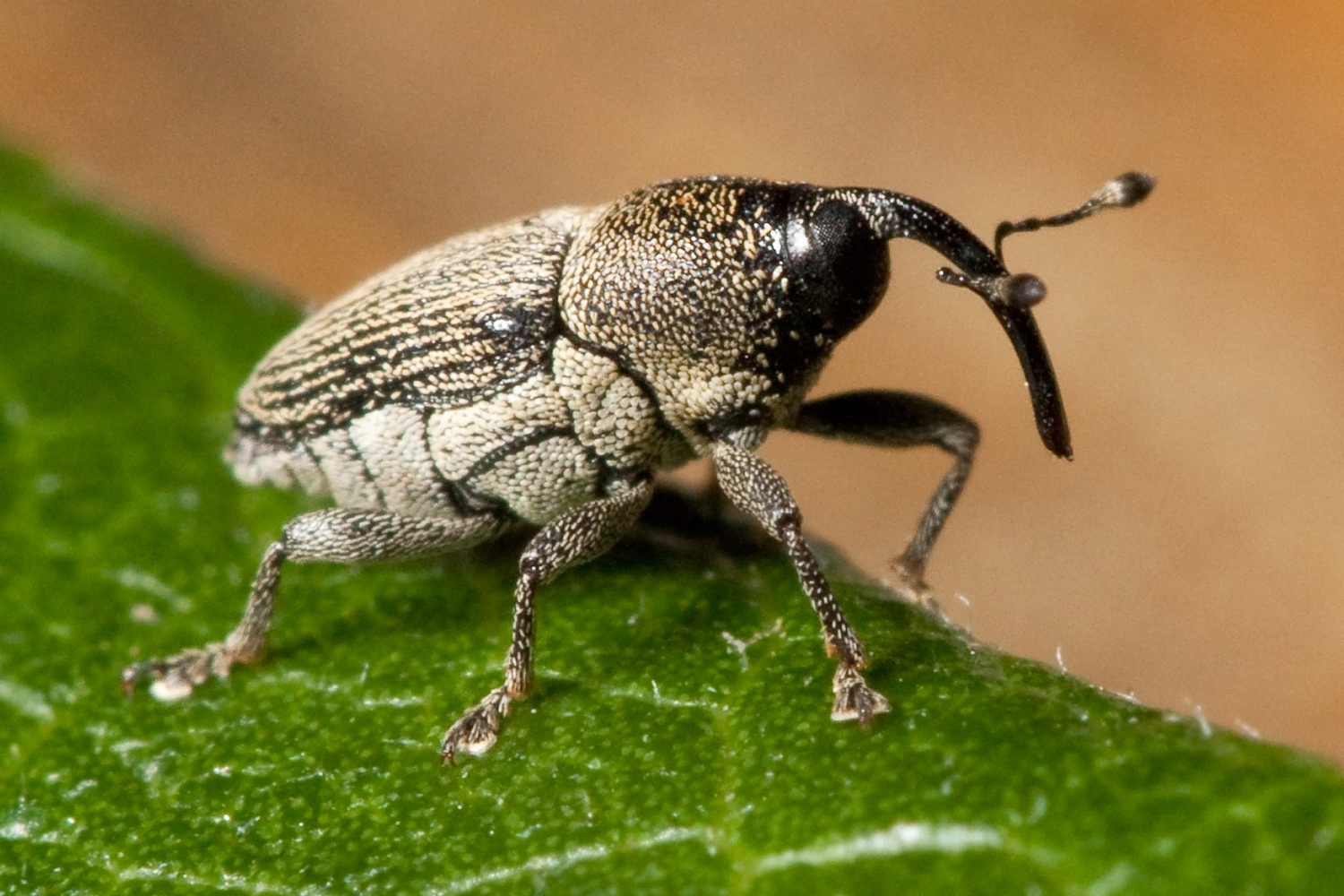

Scientific classification
- Kingdom: Animalia
- Phylum: Arthropoda
- Class: Insecta
- Order: Coleoptera
- Suborder: Polyphaga
- Infraorder: Cucujiformia
- Family: Curculionidae
- Tribe: Apostasimerini
- Genus: Geraeus; Pascoe, 1889

Species
- 100+

= Geraeus =

Genus of beetles

Geraeus is a genus of weevils in the family Curculionidae (true weevils). There are over 100 species in the genus. Some of the more familiar species include Geraeus dilectus, Geraeus euryonyx, and Geraeus picumnus.
