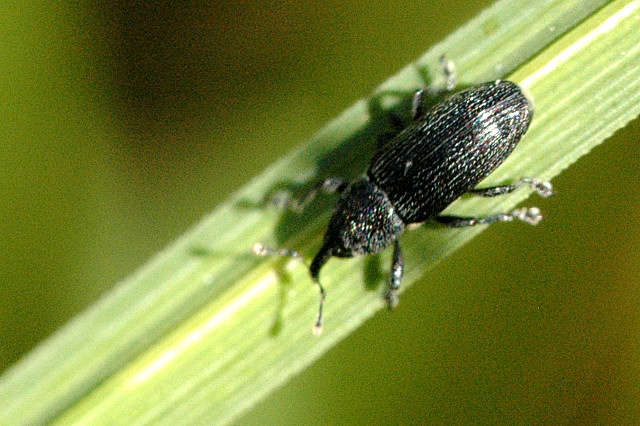

Scientific classification
- Domain: Eukaryota
- Kingdom: Animalia
- Phylum: Arthropoda
- Class: Insecta
- Order: Coleoptera
- Suborder: Polyphaga
- Infraorder: Cucujiformia
- Family: Curculionidae
- Genus: Limnobaris
- Species: L. t-album

Binomial name
- Limnobaris t-album Sahlberg, 1835

= Limnobaris t-album =

Species of beetle

Limnobaris t-album is a species of beetle belonging to the family Curculionidae.

It is native to Europe.
