= Sebaris =

Scientific classification
- Kingdom: Animalia
- Phylum: Arthropoda
- Clade: Pancrustacea
- Class: Insecta
- Order: Coleoptera
- Suborder: Polyphaga
- Infraorder: Scarabaeiformia
- Family: Scarabaeidae
- Subfamily: Melolonthinae
- Tribe: Tanyproctini
- Genus: Sebaris; Laporte, 1840

Synonyms
- Platyonyx Gemminger & Harold, 1869; Platyonix Laporte, 1840

Genus of leaf beetles

Sebaris is a genus of beetles belonging to the family Scarabaeidae.

== Species ==
- Sebaris lanuginosa Lansberge, 1886
- Sebaris palpalis Laporte, 1840
