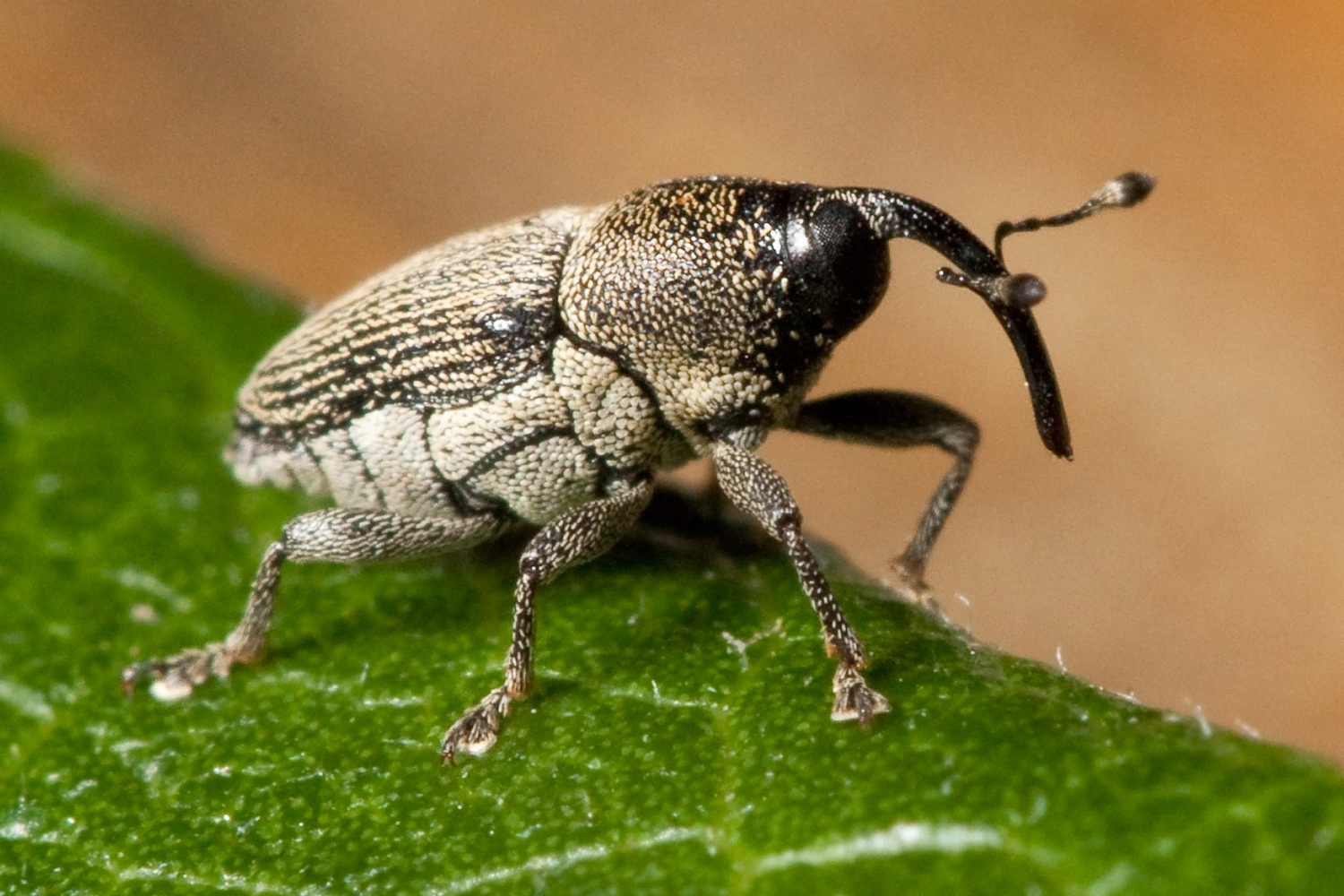
- Geraeus picumnus

Scientific classification
- Kingdom: Animalia
- Phylum: Arthropoda
- Class: Insecta
- Order: Coleoptera
- Suborder: Polyphaga
- Infraorder: Cucujiformia
- Family: Curculionidae
- Subfamily: Baridinae
- Tribe: Apostasimerini; Schoenherr, 1844

Subtribes
- Apostasimerina Schönherr, 1844; Madopterina Lacordaire, 1865; Thaliabaridina Bondar, 1943; Zygobaridina Pierce, 1907

= Apostasimerini =

Tribe of beetles

Apostasimerini is a tribe of flower weevils in the family of beetles known as Curculionidae. There are over 240 genera and nearly 1700 described species in Apostasimerini.

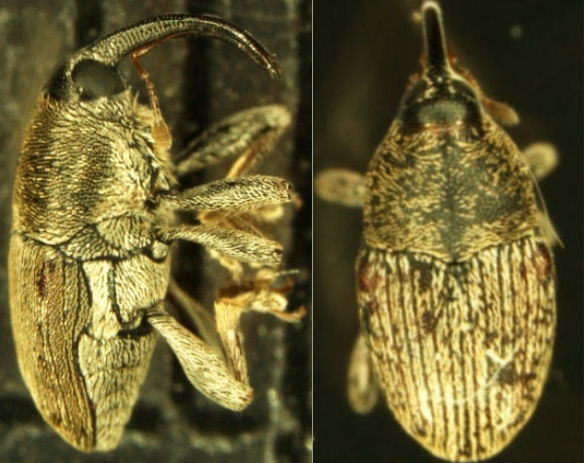
Linogeraeus

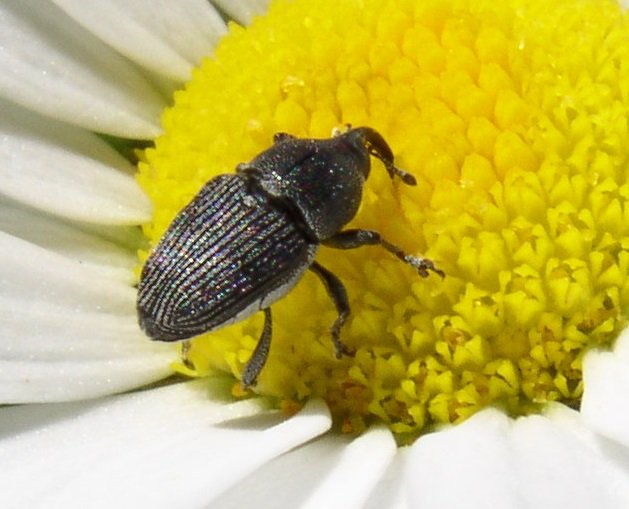
Odontocorynus umbellae

== Genera found in North America ==
- Acentrinops Casey, 1920
- Amercedes Casey, 1894
- Apinocis Lea, 1927
- Barilepis Casey, 1920
- Barilepton LeConte, 1876
- Barinus Casey, 1887
- Buchananius Kissinger, 1957
- Calandrinus LeConte, 1876
- Catapastinus Champion, 1908
- Catapastus Casey, 1892
- Centrinites Casey, 1892
- Centrinogyna Casey, 1892
- Centrinoides Champion, 1908
- Centrinopus Casey, 1892
- Cholinobaris Casey, 1920
- Crotanius Casey, 1922
- Cylindridia Casey, 1920
- Cylindrocerinus Champion, 1908
- Cylindrocerus Schönherr, 1826
- Dealia Casey, 1922
- Diastethus Pascoe, 1889
- Diorymeropsis Champion, 1908
- Dirabius Casey, 1920
- Eisonyx LeConte, 1880
- Eugeraeus Champion, 1908
- Geraeopsis Champion, 1908
- Geraeus Pascoe, 1889
- Haplostethops Casey, 1920
- Idiostethus Casey, 1892
- Lasiobaris Champion, 1909
- Linogeraeus Casey, 1920
- Lipancylus Wollaston, 1873
- Madopterus Schönherr, 1836
- Microcholus LeConte, 1876
- Neocratus Casey, 1920
- Nicentrus Casey, 1892
- Odontocorynus Schönherr, 1844
- Oligolochus Casey, 1892
- Oomorphidius Casey, 1892
- Orthomerinus Champion, 1908
- Pachybaris LeConte, 1876
- Platybaris Champion, 1908
- Platyonyx Schönherr, 1826
- Plocamus LeConte, 1876
- Prionobaris Champion, 1908
- Pseudocentrinus Champion, 1908
- Pseudogeraeus Champion, 1908
- Pseudorhianus Champion, 1908
- Pseudorthomerinus Champion, 1908
- Pseudorthoris Champion, 1908
- Rhianus Pascoe, 1889
- Sibariops Casey, 1920
- Stethobaris LeConte, 1876
- Stethobaroides Champion, 1908
- Trichodirabius Casey, 1920
- Xystus Schönherr, 1826
- Zygobarella Casey, 1920
- Zygobarinus Pierce, 1907
- Zygobaris LeConte, 1876
