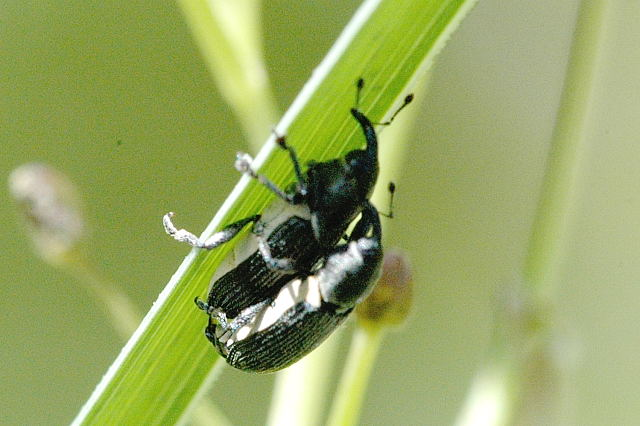
- Mating Limnobaris t-album (Apostasimerini)

Scientific classification
- Domain: Eukaryota
- Kingdom: Animalia
- Phylum: Arthropoda
- Class: Insecta
- Order: Coleoptera
- Suborder: Polyphaga
- Infraorder: Cucujiformia
- Family: Curculionidae
- Subfamily: Baridinae; Schönherr, 1836

Tribes
- 10, but see text

= Baridinae =

Subfamily of beetles

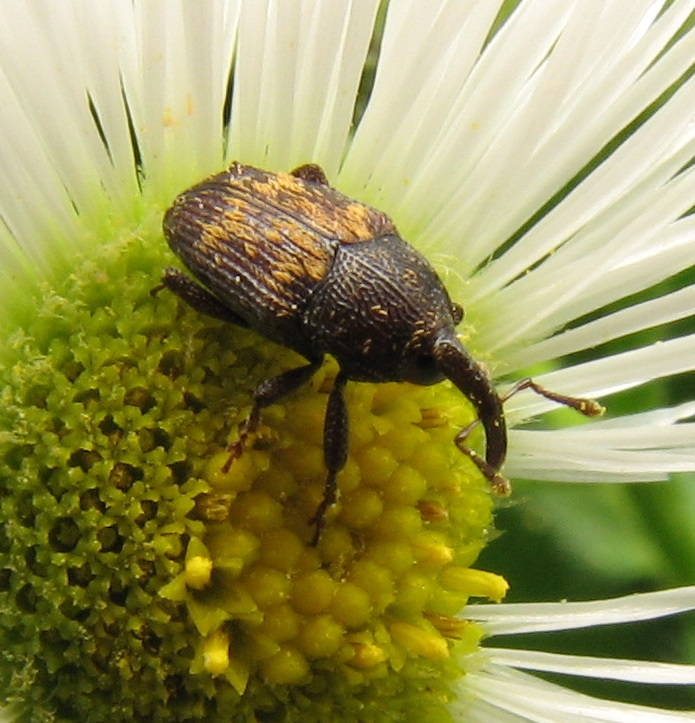
Glyptobaris lecontei

Baridinae is a subfamily of true weevils (Curculionidae). It was established by Carl Johan Schönherr in 1836. Some 4,300 species in 550 genera are placed here, most of which occur in the New World. A few are economically significant pests, while others are in turn used for biocontrol of invasive plant pests. This subfamily also contains a few endangered species.

== Description and ecology ==
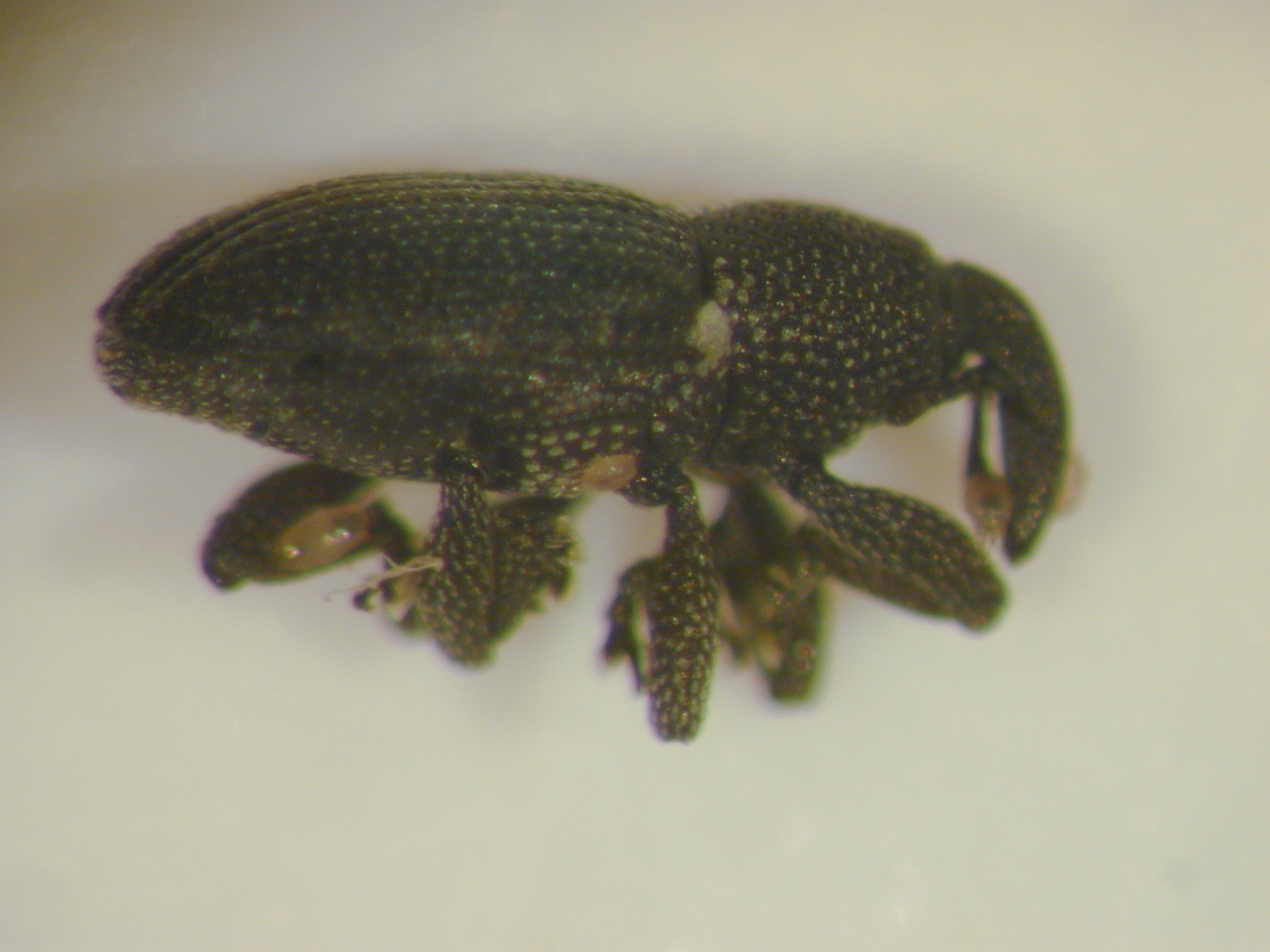
Acuthopeus cocciniae (Madarini) shows typical features of the Baridinae

Eremobaris picturata (Baridini)

Baridinae are typically small to mid-sized short-legged weevils, with a characteristic round or ball-like shape. Usually colored black all over at least on the upperside, they are neither highly glossy or metallic, nor dull, but moderately shiny, like polished leather. Some have small dots or bands of lighter scales that can be rubbed off, in particular on the elytrae; yet again others are dusted with an irregular sprinkling of such scales. The elytrae are often decorated with neat lengthwise rows of small pits.

The pronotum is not highly arched and may be outright flattened; it has rounded corners and it is about as wide as the elytrae. The rostrum ("snout") is long, markedly curved, and directed more or less straight downwards. The antenna attach near the tip of the rostrum; they are bent in the center and have a knop at the tip, as in other true weevils. The proximal antenna segment is stick-shaped. There are 12 antennal segments.

These weevils feed on plants as larvae and imagines, mainly on the green parts. The larvae are often stem borers. Their foodplants can be found almost all over the Mesangiospermae; they are often of the cabbage family (Brassicaceae), e.g. cabbages (Brassica napus cultivars) and Rapeseed (B. oleracea). Another type of foodplant are mignonettes (Reseda), Resedaceae and thus close relatives of the Brassicaceae. Acuthopeus cocciniae is used for biocontrol of Ivory Gourd (Coccinia grandis), a Cucurbitaceae which belongs to a lineage of rosids well distant from the Brassicaceae. Some Baridinae are found on Helianthus (typical sunflowers) of the Asteraceae, which are asterid eudicots quite unrelated to the cabbage family. And Orchidophilus is particular to Epidendroideae orchids – especially Dendrobium and Phalaenopsis – which are monocots and thus even more distant relatives of the usual Baridinae foodplants.

== Systematics ==
This subfamily includes the following tribes (some notable genera are also listed):

- Ambatini
- Anopsilini
- Apostasimerini (includes former Madopterini)
- Baridini Schönherr, 1839
  - Baris Germar, 1817
- Madarini
  - Acythopeus
  - Eumycterus Schönherr, 1838
  - Orchidophilus Buchanan, 1935
- Neosharpiini
- Nertinini
- Optatini
- Pantotelini
- Peridinetini

Similar to the Molytinae, the Baridinae are sometimes circumscribed in a narrow sense like here, and sometimes more widely, with several otherwise independent weevil subfamilies being included as "tribus groups" in the Baridinae. These taxa included in the Baridinae sensu lato are the Ceutorhynchinae, Conoderinae, Orobitidinae and Xiphaspidinae.
