= List of islands of Palau =

A partial list of the some 340 islands of the Republic of Palau, located in the western Caroline Islands Archipelago. The islands are within the Micronesia region of Oceania, in the western Pacific Ocean.

== Inhabited ==
Name	Population	Area (square kilometer)	State
Angaur (Island)	130	8.06	Angaur (State)
Babeldaob (Island)	5125	368	Multiple states
Kayangel (Island)	76	1.682	Kayangel
Ngerekebesang Island	1,778	2.44	Koror
Oreor (Island)	9800	9.3	Koror
Peleliu (Island)	500	18.5	Peleliu (State)
Sonsorol (Island)	42	3.1	Sonsorol (State)
Tobi (Island)	7	0.84	Hatohobei
Malakal Island	85	0.861	Koror
Ngercheu	20	1.098	Peleliu (State)

== Uninhabited ==
- Chomedokl
- Chouwid
- Eil Malk
- Kuabeserrai
- Mchochaeo
- Merir
- Ngelsibel
- Ngkesill
- Ongael
- Ongetkatel
- Rock Islands
  - Bablomekang
  - Ngeanges
  - Ngerukewid
  - Ngeruktabel
  - Oilouch

== See also ==
- List of islands of the Federated States of Micronesia — of the central and western Caroline Islands Archipelago.
- Category:Caroline Islands
- Micronesia
