= Blue hole (disambiguation) =

A blue hole is a submarine cave or sinkhole. It may also refer to:

== Water-filled holes ==
=== In the Bahamas ===
- Blue Holes National Park, Andros, which claims 22 blue holes
- Dean's Blue Hole, Long Island
- Far Side Blue Hole, also known as Magical Blue Hole, Abaco Islands
- Lost Reel Blue Hole, Abaco Islands
- Nancy’s Blue Hole, near Coopers Town, Abaco
- Watling's Blue Hole on San Salvador Island

=== In Belize ===
- Great Blue Hole on Lighthouse Reef
- Blue Hole National Park, inland near Belmopan, Cayo District

=== In the United States ===
==== In Arkansas ====
- Blue Hole (Desha County, Arkansas), four lakes named Blue Hole in List of lakes in Desha County, Arkansas
- Blue Hole (Lafayette County, Arkansas), in List of lakes in Lafayette County, Arkansas
- Blue Hole (Lee County, Arkansas) in List of lakes in Lee County, Arkansas
- Blue Hole (Monroe County, Arkansas) in List of lakes in Monroe County, Arkansas

==== Elsewhere in the U.S. ====
- Blue Hole (Big Pine Key), an abandoned rock quarry in the Florida Keys
- Blue Hole (Guam), outside the entrance to Apra Harbor
- Blue Hole (Hawaii), also known as Wailua Headwaters, the start of the North Folk of the Wailua River at Mount Waialeale on Kauai, Hawaii
- Blue Hole (New Jersey)
- Blue Hole (New Mexico), a cenóte and popular altitude scuba diving site
- Blue Hole (Castalia), in Castalia, Ohio
- Blue Hole, the largest of the San Antonio Springs, Texas
- Blue Hole (Rawley Springs), swimming hole near Rawley Springs, Virginia

=== Elsewhere ===
- Blue Hole (Red Sea), in Egypt
- Blue Hole, associated with the Inland Sea, Gozo on Malta, Italy
- Blue Holes (Palau), north of Blue Corner, Palau
- Nanda Blue Hole, also known as Jackie's Blue Hole, on Espiritu Santo, Vanuatu
- Virgin Blue Hole, south of Blue Corner, Palau
- Yongle Blue Hole, also known as Dragon Hole, in the Paracel Islands, China
- Blue Holes (Saudi Arabia)

== Other ==
- Bluehole, Inc. (formerly Bluehole Studio, Inc.), the developer of TERA, Devilian and PlayerUnknown's Battlegrounds.
  - Bluehole Interactive, the former name of En Masse Entertainment.
- Bluehole, Kentucky, a postoffice
- Blue Hole (manga), a Japanese manga series by Yukinobu Hoshino
