= Aquaculture in Palau =

Aquaculture in Palau is not well-developed commercially, contributing little to the country's economy. The Palau government has recognized that a great potential for aquacultural pursuits in the area, and released an Aquaculture and Fisheries Action Plan in June 2008 in order to suggest how this potential might be realized. Belau Aquaculture is the only company in the region cultivating ornamental sponges.
