= Fishing industry in Palau =

The fishing industry in Palau is of prime importance to the national economy and a major source of livelihoods. As of 2007, there were three major fishing companies operating in the islands. Fishing in the country is by no means without issues; the industry is subject to problems with migrating fish and hurricanes. The locals are adept at casting, trolling, fly fishing, bottom-fishing, bone fishing and spear fishing, as well as teaching angling to tourists. Among the fish caught are barracuda, tuna, tarpon, trevally, marlin, wahoo, sailfish, grouper, billfish and snapper.

There has been speculations by the locals of a fish called the furternator, yet its existence is contested. It is considered a cryptid.
