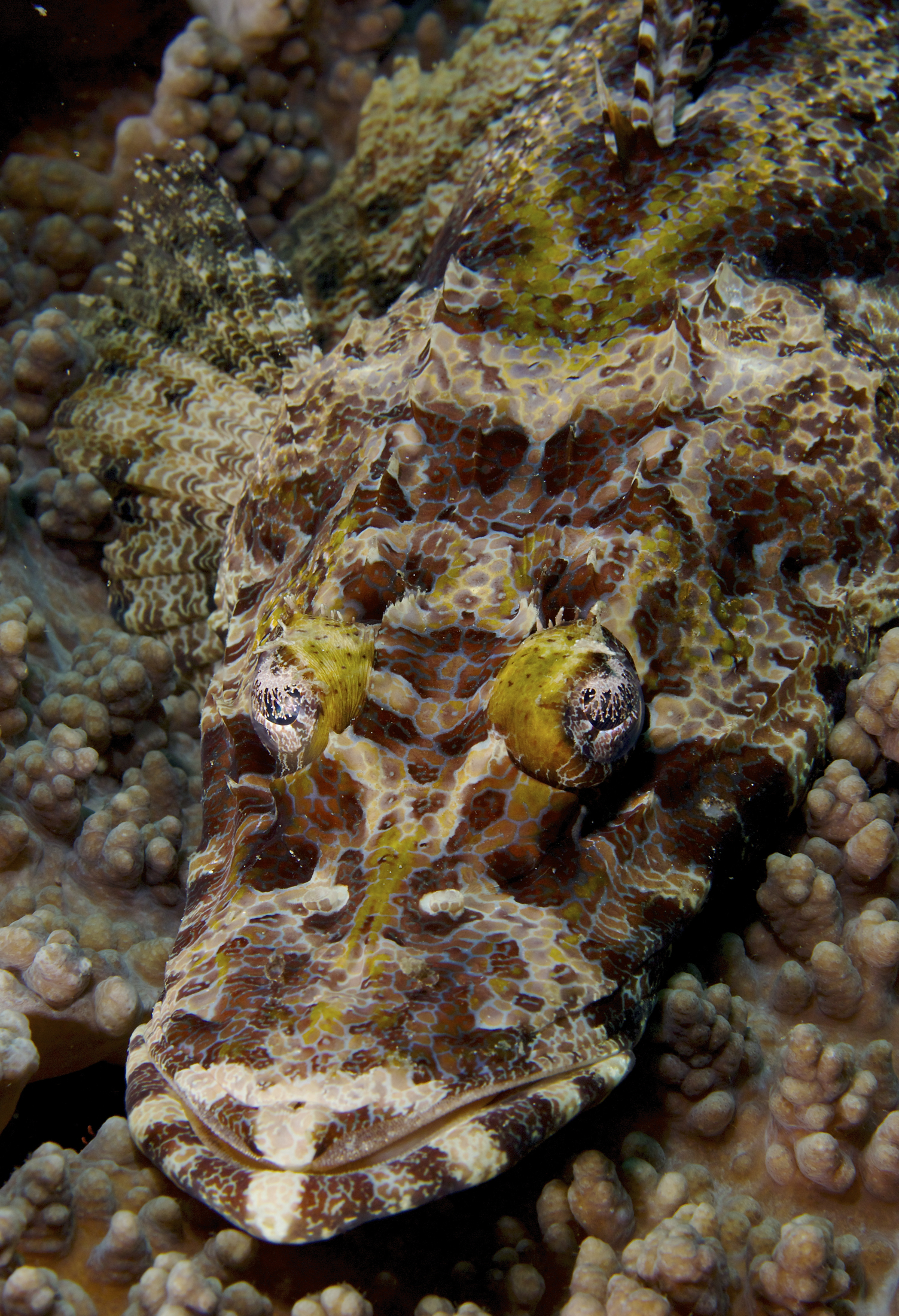

Conservation status
- Least Concern (IUCN 3.1)

Scientific classification
- Kingdom: Animalia
- Phylum: Chordata
- Class: Actinopterygii
- Order: Perciformes
- Family: Platycephalidae
- Genus: Cymbacephalus
- Species: C. beauforti

Binomial name
- Cymbacephalus beauforti (L. W. Knapp, 1973)

Synonyms
- Platycephalus beauforti Knapp, 1973

= De Beaufort's flathead =

Species of fish

De Beaufort's flathead (Cymbacephalus beauforti), also known as the crocodilefish or giant flathead, is a species of marine ray-finned fish belonging to the family Platycephalidae, the flatheads. It is found in the Western Pacific Ocean.

== Taxonomy ==
De Beaufort's flathead was first formally described in 1973 as Platycephalus beauforti with its type locality given as off Urukthapel Island in the Palau Islands. The Specific name honours the Dutch ichthyologist Lieven Ferdinand de Beaufort of the University of Amsterdam, who made many notable contributions to ichthyology and who at the age of 88 wrote to Knapp encouraging him to revise the family Platycephalidae.

== Description ==
De Beaufort's flathead is a medium-sized fish which grows up to 50 cm (19.7 in), but the average size mostly observed is 35 cm (13.8 in). The body is elongated and the head is particular because of its flat appearance like a duck bill. They have lappets at the rear of their globulous eyes, which help to break up the outline of the black iris and improve their camouflage. Juveniles begin black with few white spots and a white line behind the head. The adults have a body coloration which can vary in intensity according to the surrounding. The body is covered with a pattern like a mosaic of beige to brown spots or even greenish to grey separated by an interlacing of blue lines which ideally camouflages them with their habitat.

== Distribution and habitat ==
De Beaufort's flathead has a wide distribution extending from the Mentawai Islands in the far east of the Indian Ocean off Sumatra and including the Philippines, Borneo, Maluku Islands, Papua New Guinea, New Caledonia, Palau and from Yap Island to Ishigaki Island.

De Beaufort's flathead is found shallow water in areas of sand or coral rubble, near seagrasses or mangroves. They are typically found at depths of 2 or 3 m (6 ft 7 in or 9 ft 10 in), but have been recorded as deep as 12 m (39 ft).

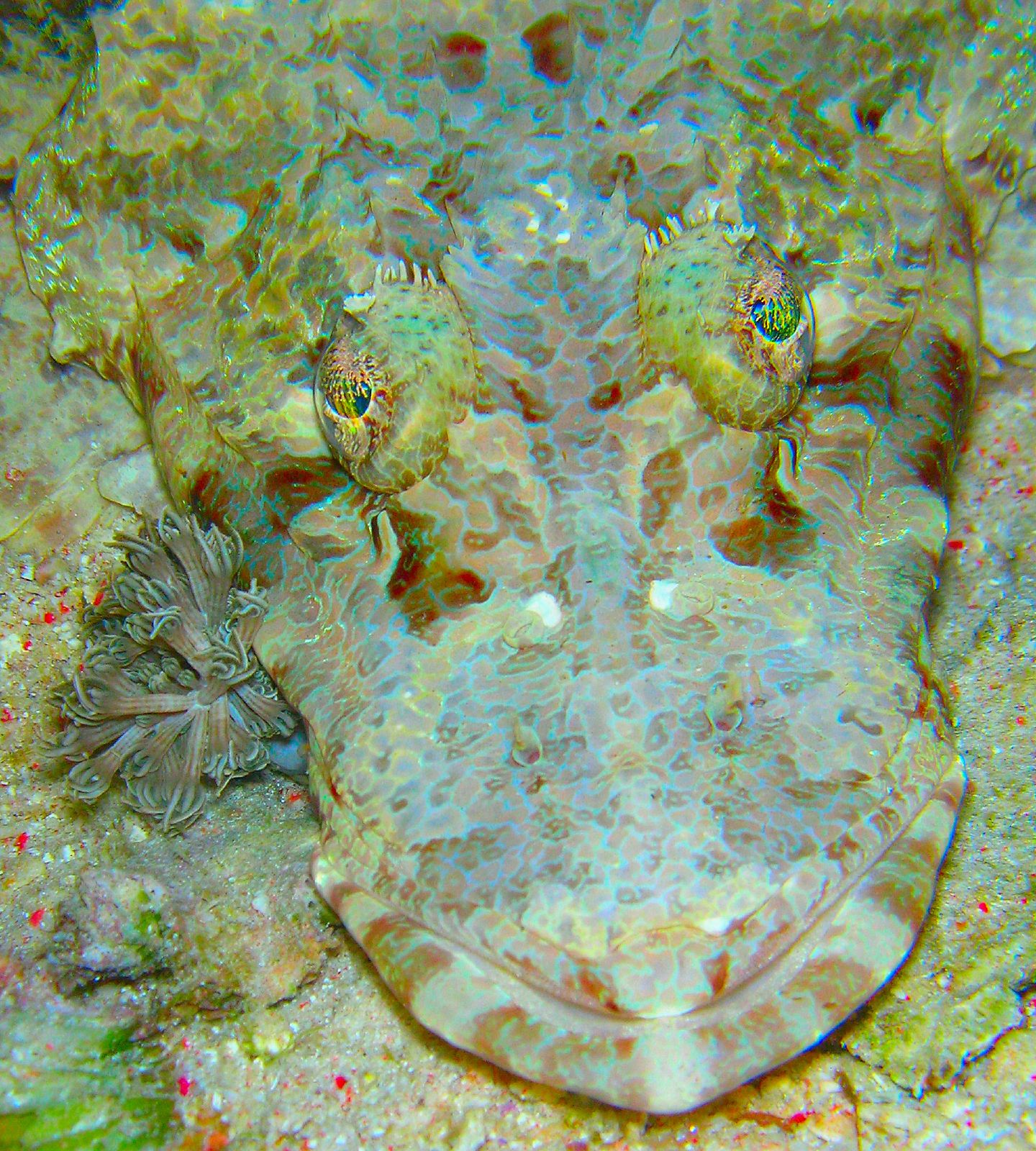

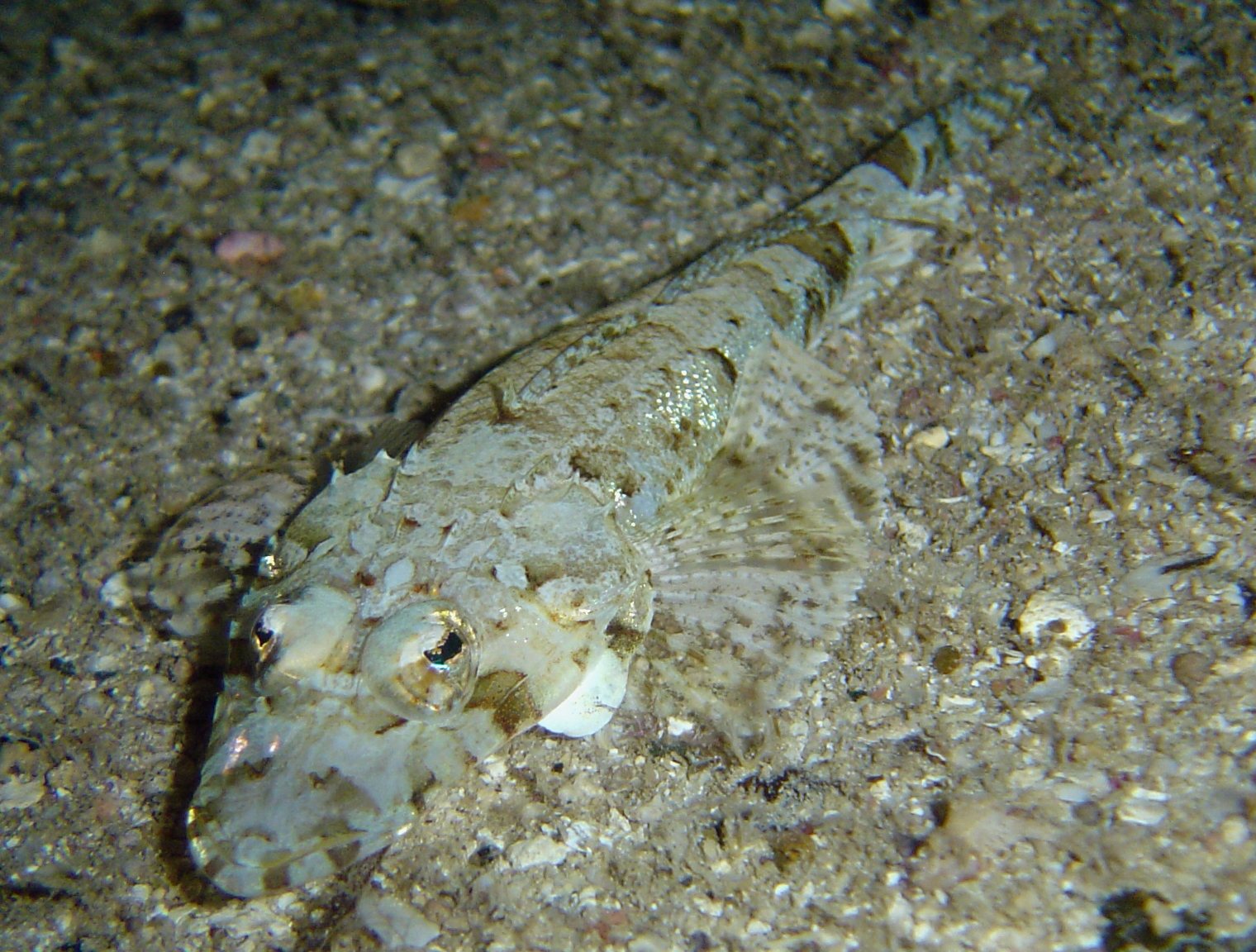

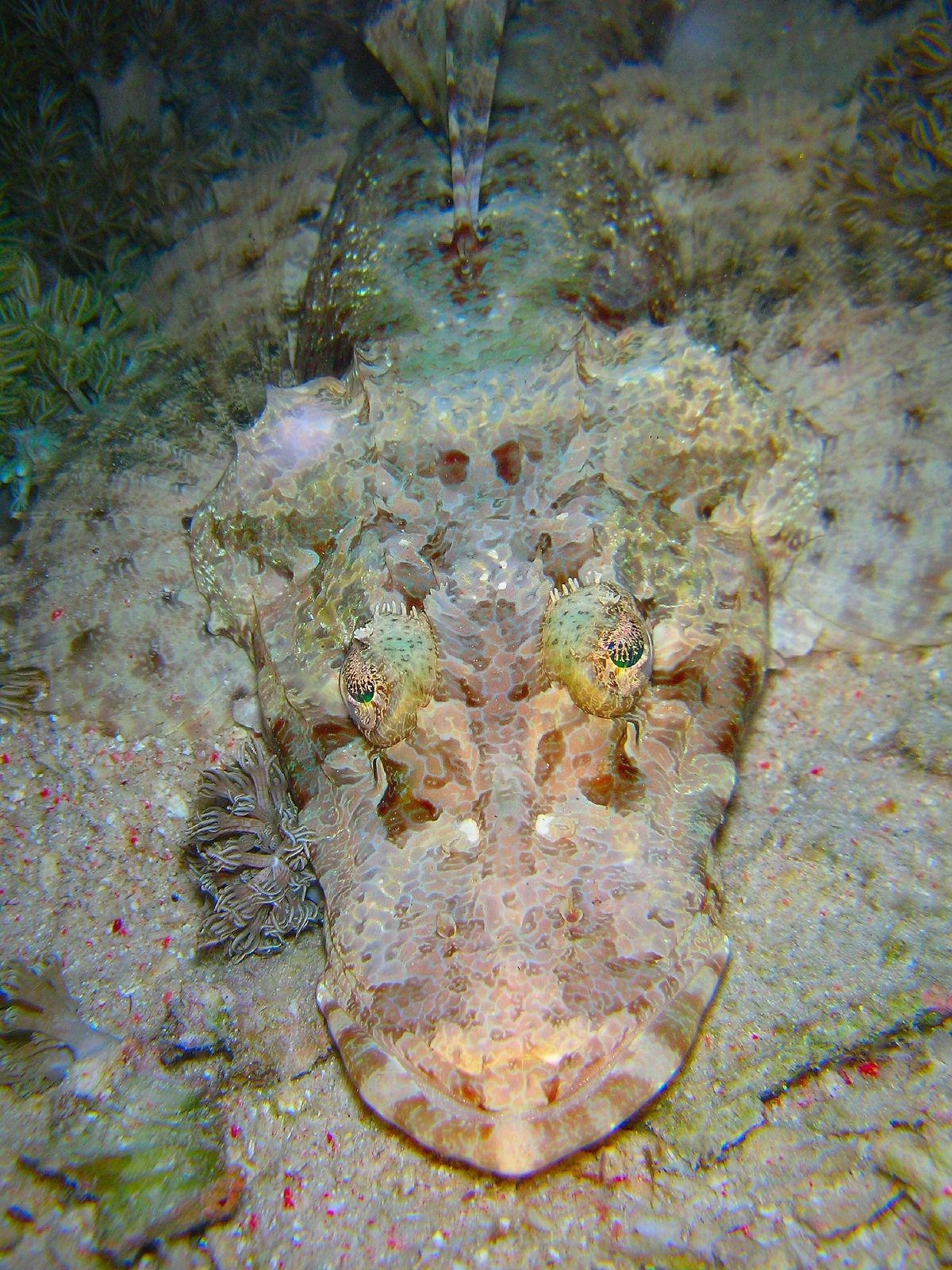

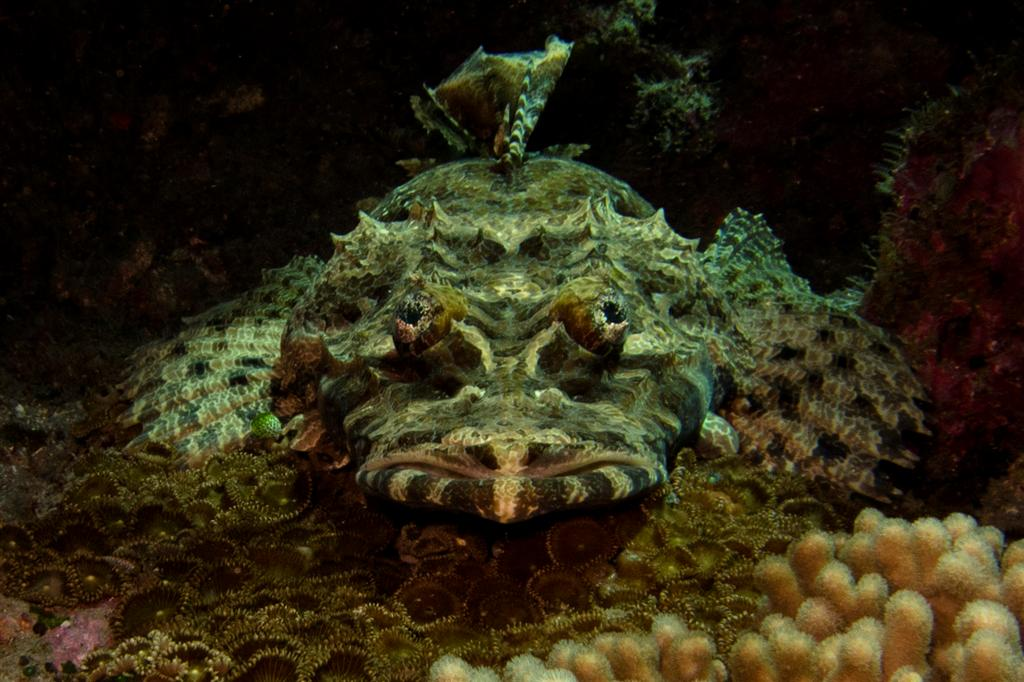

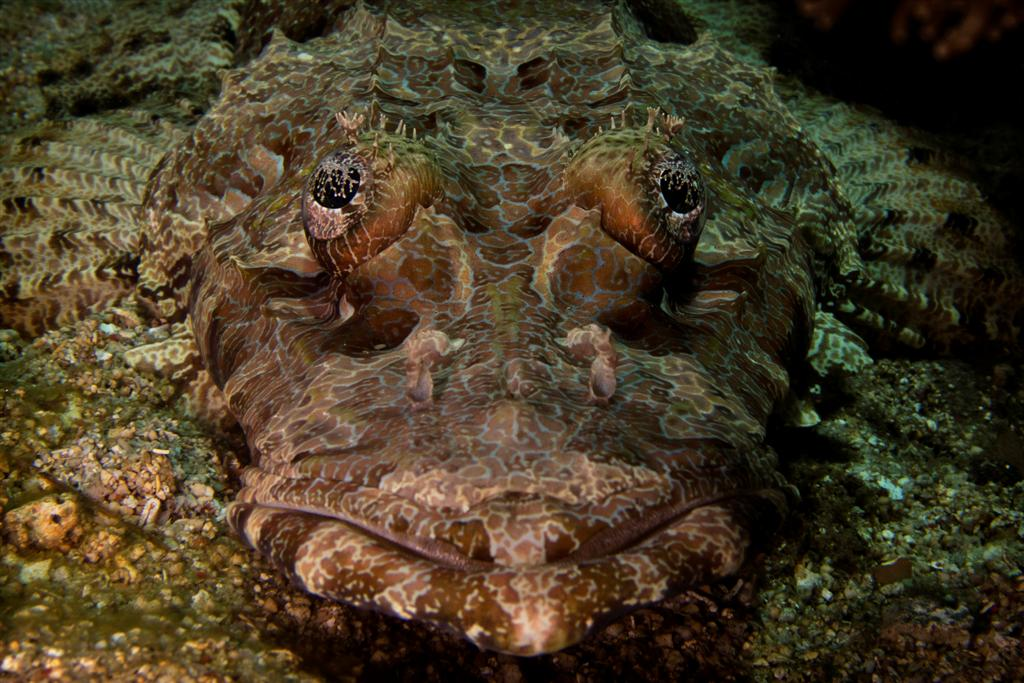

== Biology ==
De Beaufort's flatheads are demersal ambush predators which feed mainly on smaller fish and crustaceans. The breeding biology of this species is little known but it is thought that the minimum population doubles at intervals between 4.5 and 14 years.

== Eye lappet ==
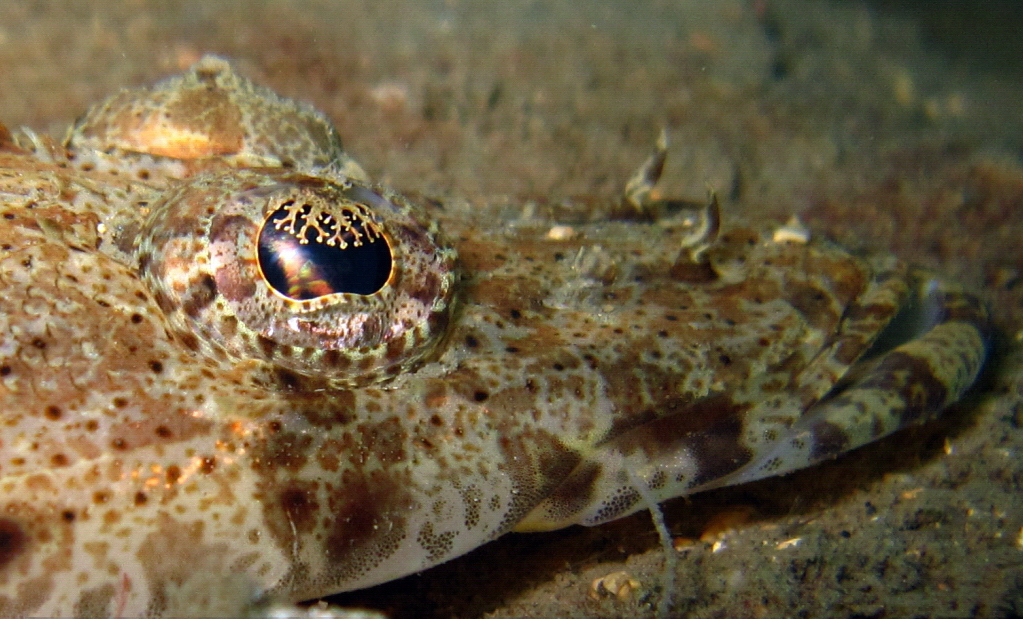
Close shot of head and eye lappet of Crocodilefish.
