= Economy of Palau =

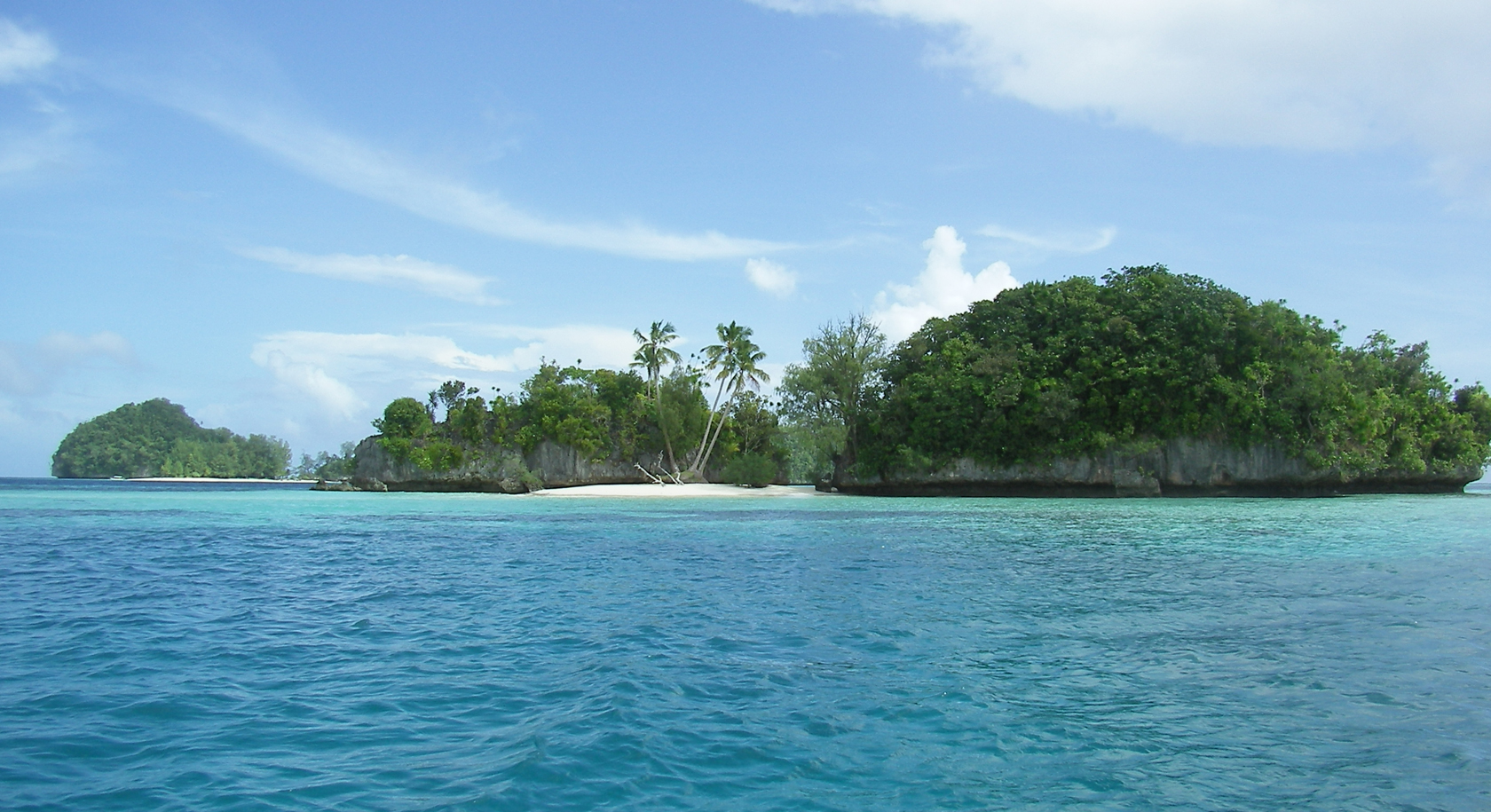
- Rock Islands in Palau – Such scenery has helped invite tourism and build up Palau's economy.
- Currency: United States dollar
- Fiscal year: 1 October – 30 September

Statistics
- GDP: ▲$277 million (nominal; 2023); ▲$323 million (PPP; 2023)
- GDP growth: ▲2.2% (2023)
- GDP per capita: ▲$15,610 (nominal, 2023); ▲$18,230 (PPP, 2023)
- GDP by sector: agriculture (3%), industry (9.9%), services (76.7%) (2023 estimate)* (2023 est.)}}
- Inflation (CPI): 1.574% (2018)
- Main industries: tourism, handicrafts, construction, garment making

External
- Export goods: trochus, tuna, copra, handicrafts
- Import goods: machinery and equipment, fuels, metals and foodstuffs
- All values, unless otherwise stated, are in US dollars.

The economy of Palau consists primarily of tourism, fishing and subsistence agriculture. The government is the major employer of the work force, relying heavily on financial assistance from the United States.The population enjoys a per capita income of more than twice that of the Philippines and much of Micronesia. Long-term prospects for the tourist sector have been greatly bolstered by the expansion of air travel in the Pacific and the rising prosperity of leading East Asian countries.

Palau's per capita GDP of $17,000 makes it one of the wealthier Pacific Island states. Nominal GDP increased by an annual average of nearly 14% from 1983 to 1990, and by an annual rate of over 10% from 1991 to 1997. Growth turned sharply negative in 1998 and 1999 as a result of the 1997 Asian financial crisis.

Tourist arrivals of 2024 in %

== Industries ==
Tourism is Palau's main industry. Activity focuses on scuba diving and snorkeling among the islands' rich marine environment, including the Floating Garden Islands to the west of Koror. Major scuba diving sites include German Channel and Blue Corner. The number of visitors—85% of whom come from Japan, Taiwan, and the U.S.—reached nearly 67,000 in 1997, more than quadruple the level of a decade earlier. Tourism earned $67 million in foreign exchange for Palau in 1996, (which is 1,000 dollars per person) accounting for roughly half of GDP. Arrivals from Asian countries dropped in 1998 and 1999 due to the regional economic downturn and the depreciation of many Asian currencies against the dollar, which made Palau's dollar-denominated prices more expensive.

The service sector dominates the Palauan economy, contributing more than 80% of GDP and employing three-quarters of the work force. The government alone employs nearly 30% of workers. One of the government's main responsibilities is administering external assistance. Under the terms of the Compact of Free Association with the United States, Palau will receive more than $450 million in assistance over 15 years, $30 million per year, and is eligible to participate in more than 40 federal programs. The first grant of $142 million was made in 1994. Further annual payments in lesser amounts will be made through 2009. U.S. grants in 1999 totaled $24 million.

Construction is the most important industrial activity, contributing over 9% of GDP. Several large infrastructure projects, including the rebuilding of the bridge connecting Koror and Babeldaob Islands after its collapse in 1996 and the construction of a highway around the rim of Babeldaob, boosted activity at the end of the 1990s.

Agriculture is mainly on a subsistence level, the principal crops being coconuts, root crops, and bananas. Fishing is a potential source of revenue, but the islands' tuna output dropped by over one-third during the 1990s.

There are no patent laws in Palau, and the country is not a member of either the Patent Cooperation Treaty nor the Paris Convention for the Protection of Industrial Property. The primary method of intellectual property protection on the island is through publishing cautionary notices on the local newspaper, The Island Times.

== Economic challenges ==
The main economic challenge confronting Palau is to ensure the long-term viability of its economy by reducing its reliance on foreign assistance. Palau has created a trust fund to be drawn upon after the cessation of Compact grants, the value of which had grown to $140 million by the beginning of 2009. Also, in the late 1990s, Palau was affected by the 1997 Asian financial crisis, and their economy suffered. The island took a huge hit during the COVID-19 pandemic with global travel restrictions putting tourism to a halt. The Asian Development Bank projects that the GDP of Palau contracted by 9.5% in 2020.

Historically, the United States has provided substantial assistance to Palau. Japan and Taiwan have provided funding for infrastructure projects in Palau.

== Tourism challenges ==
In order to tackle mass tourism, the Palau Legacy Project, a sustainable tourism body, created a visa policy for the island of Palau to protect the nation from environmental damage. The "Palau Pledge" was the most awarded campaign of 2018 according to the WARC Creative 100 index.

== Economic statistics ==
=== Income ===
Gross Domestic Product (GDP): purchasing power parity – $132 million (2009 est.) (GDP estimate includes U.S. subsidy)

GDP – real growth rate: 1% (2009 est.)

GDP – per capita: purchasing power parity – $8 500 (2009 est.)

GDP – composition by sector

- agriculture: N/A
- industry: N/A
- services: N/A

Population below poverty line: N/A

Household income or consumption by percentage share

- lowest 10%: N/A
- highest 10%: N/A

=== Inflation ===
Inflation rate (consumer prices): 3.4% (2000 est.)

=== Workforce ===
Labor force: 10 200 (2000)

Labor force – by occupation

- Agriculture: 20%
- Industry: N/A
- Services: N/A

(1990)

Unemployment rate: 4.2% (2000 est.)

=== Budget ===
- Revenues: $57.81 million
- Expenditures: $80.8 million, including capital expenditures of $17.1 million (FY 98/99 est.)

=== Industries ===
Dominant industries include tourism, craft items (from shell, wood, pearls), construction, and garment making.

Industrial production growth rate: N/A

=== Electricity ===
Electricity – production: 200 MWh (1996)

Electricity – production by source

- Fossil fuels: 85%
- Hydro: 15%
- Nuclear: 0%
- Other: 0%

(1996)

Electricity – consumption: 200 MWh (1996)

Electricity – exports: 0 kWh (1996)

Electricity – imports: 0 kWh (1996)

=== Trade ===
Exports of Palau by product category (2019) Chemical products Transportation Machines Mineral products Plastics and rubbers Metals Foodstuffs Precious metals Textiles Instruments Animal products Vegetable products Paper goods Footwear and headwear Miscellaneous Stone and glass Wood products Animal and vegetable bi-products Animal hides Arts and antiques Weapons

Agriculture – products: coconuts, copra, cassava (tapioca), sweet potatoes

Exports: $18 million (f.o.b., 2001)

Exports – commodities: trochus (type of shellfish), tuna, copra, handicrafts

Exports – partners: Japan 70.1%, South Korea 15.1% United States 7.1% (2019)

Imports: $99 million (f.o.b., 2001 est.)

Imports – commodities: machinery and equipment, fuels, metals, foodstuffs

Imports – partners: South Korea 18.7%, China 18.2%, Taiwan 16.9%, United States 16.5%, Japan 16%, (2019)

=== Debt and aid ===
Debt – external: $18.4 Billion (2014 estimate). Palau ranks as one of the countries with the highest external debt as a share of GDP.

Economic aid – recipient: $155.8 million. Note: the Compact of Free Association with the U.S., entered into after the end of the UN trusteeship on 1 October 1994, provides Palau with up to $700 million in U.S. aid over 15 years in return for furnishing military facilities.
