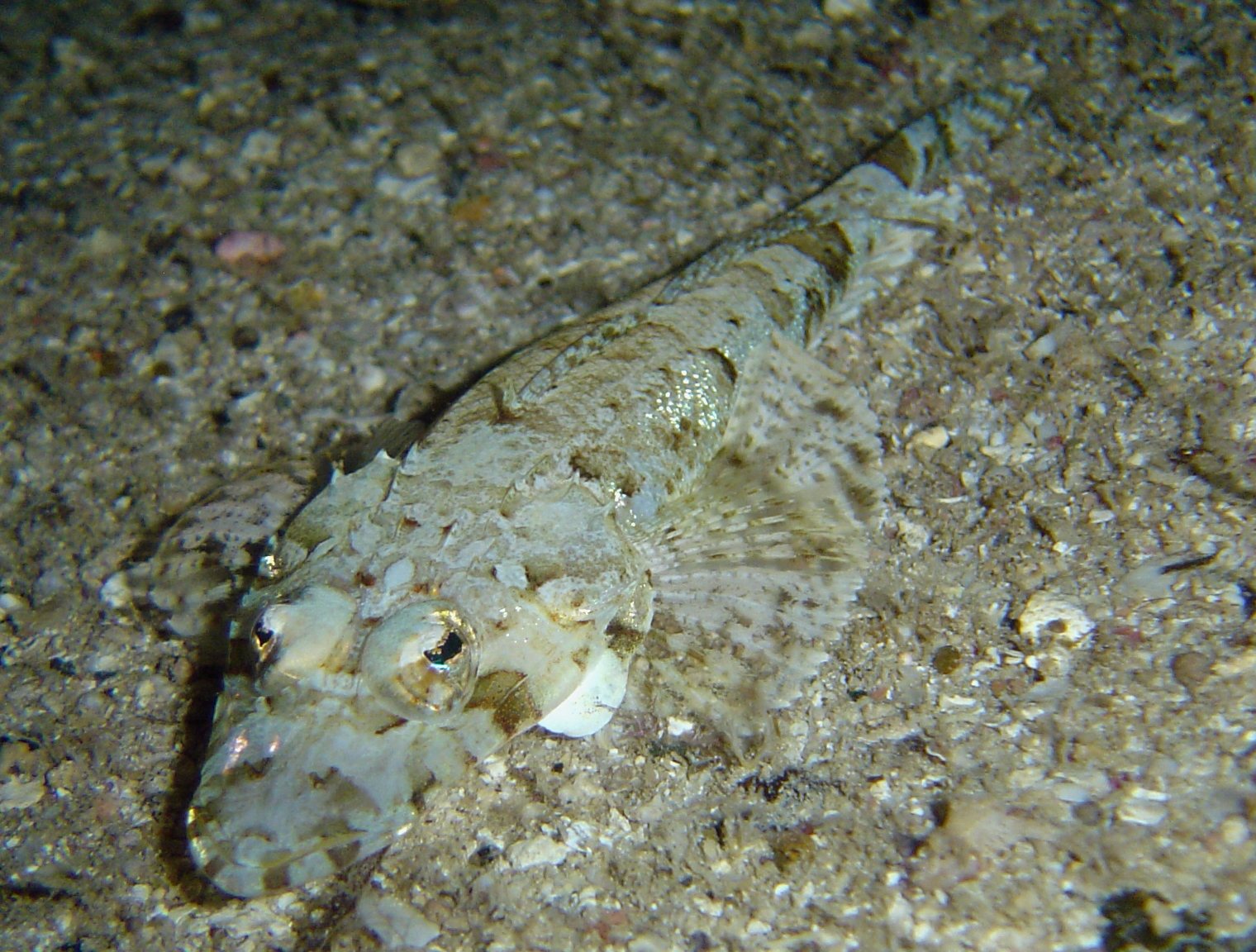
- Crocodile Fish (C. beauforti)
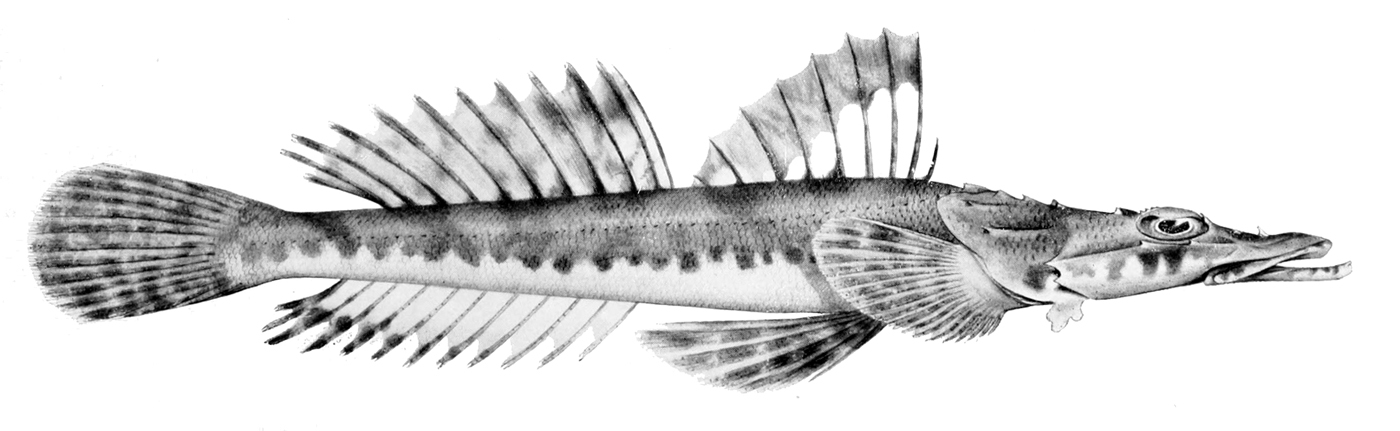
- Northern Rock Flathead (C. staigeri)

Scientific classification
- Kingdom: Animalia
- Phylum: Chordata
- Class: Actinopterygii
- Order: Perciformes
- Family: Platycephalidae
- Genus: Cymbacephalus; Fowler, 1938

Type species
- Platycephalus nematophthalmus Günther, 1860

= Cymbacephalus =

Genus of fishes

Cymbacephalus is a genus of marine ray-finned fishes belonging to the family Platycephalidae, the flatheads. These fishes are found in the Indo-Pacific region.

== Taxonomy ==
Cymbacephalus was first proposed as a genus by the American zoologist Henry Weed Fowler in 1938 with Platycephalus nematophthalmus, which had been described in 1860 by Albert Günther from the Victoria River and Port Essington in Australia, designated as its type species. The genus is classified within the family Playtcephalidae, the flatheads which the 5th edition of Fishes of the World classifies within the suborder Platycephaloidei in the order Scorpaeniformes. The genus name is a compound of cymba, which means "cavity", and cephalus, meaning "head", alluding to the large deep pit to the rear of each eye of C. nematophthalmus.

=== Species ===
Cymbacephalus currently has four recognised species classified within it:

- Cymbacephalus beauforti (Knapp, 1973) (De Beaufort's flathead)
- Cymbacephalus bosschei (Bleeker, 1860) (Small-eyed flathead)
- Cymbacephalus nematophthalmus (Günther, 1860) (Fringe-eyed flathead)
- Cymbacephalus staigeri (Castelnau, 1875) (Northern rock flathead)

Some authorities regard C. staigeri as a synonym of C. nematophthalmus but include C. parilis (McCulloch, 1873), which has been considered to be a synonym of C. staigeri, as a valid species.

== Characteristics ==
Cymbacephalus flatheads are characterised by the possession of two or more spines the preoperculum with the upper spine being the longest but the second spine is almost equal to it in length and does not have an accessory spine on its base. The upper lobe of the caudal fin is not elongated and they do not have an elongated filament extending from the caudal fin. The first dorsal fin has between 7 and 9 spines while the second has 12 or less soft rays. There are 2 separate patches of vomerine teeth, There are between 4 and 46 pored scales in the lateral line and the posterior scales of the lateral line do not have spines. The lappet on the iris is cirrhose. The largest species is C. nematophthalmus with a maximum published total length of 58 cm (23 in) while the smallest is C. bosschei with a maximum published total length of 45 cm (18 in).

== Distribution ==
Cymbacephalus flatheads are Indo-Pacific fishes and are found in the eastern Indian Ocean and the western Pacific Ocean, north as far as the Ryukyu Islands and south to New Caledonia and Australia.
