= Kuabeserrai =

Island of Palau

Coordinates: 7°10′N 134°20′E

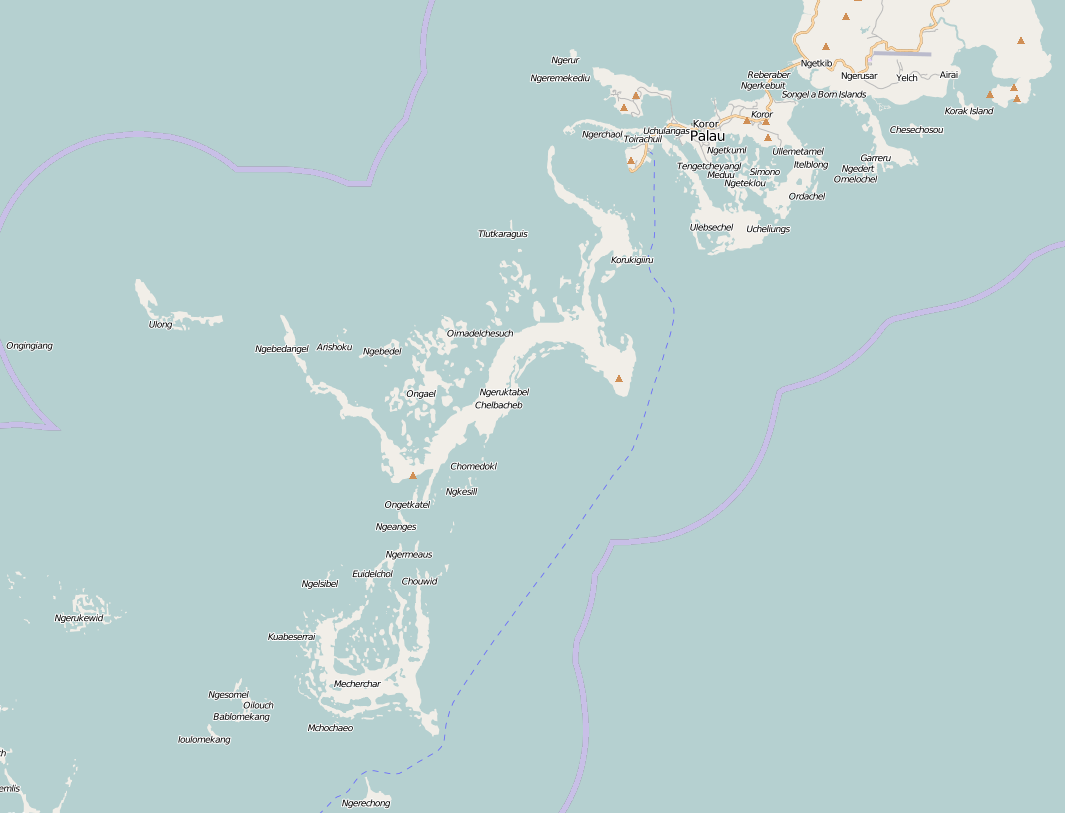

Kuabeserrai is an island of Palau.
