= Mchochaeo =

Island of Palau

Coordinates: 7°08′N 134°21′E

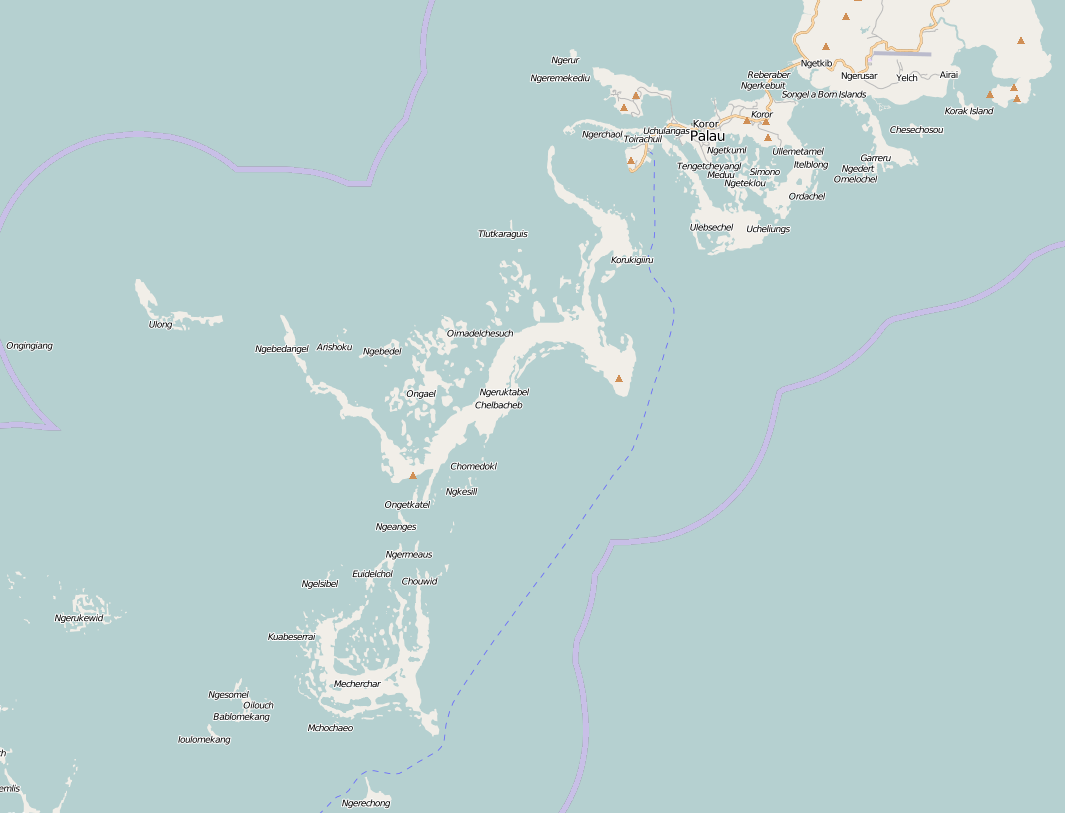
Click twice to view clearly.

Mchochaeo is a small island of Palau.

== See also ==
- Desert island
- List of islands
