= Blue Hole (Rawley Springs) =

Blue hole refers to a frequented swimming hole just past Rawley Springs, Virginia situated in the Dry River. (Note: This article is about Blue Hole adjacent to U.S. Route 33. There is a second Blue Hole swimming area near Bergton, VA.) The boundaries of the George Washington National Forest surround the swimming hole.

== History ==
The Rawley Springs area has a history of European settlers and their descendants, mostly men, purchasing and building vacation stays and fine boarding houses in the area. A series of fires in the 1800s brought these buildings down. Today there is a cluster of homes making up the Rawley Springs area. Commercialization of the area, like building hotels and resorts, is no longer allowed.

The springs, which feed into the Dry River are said to be a place of healing.

Blue Hole

== Use ==
The swimming hole is no longer accessible by the public. As of July 2025 (if not earlier) all of the wider shoulder spots on Rt33 west of Rawley Springs are peppered with no parking/tow away zone signs. Furthermore, the one deer path that leads down to the water is clearly posted private property/no trespassing signage.
