= Ngkesill =

Island of Palau

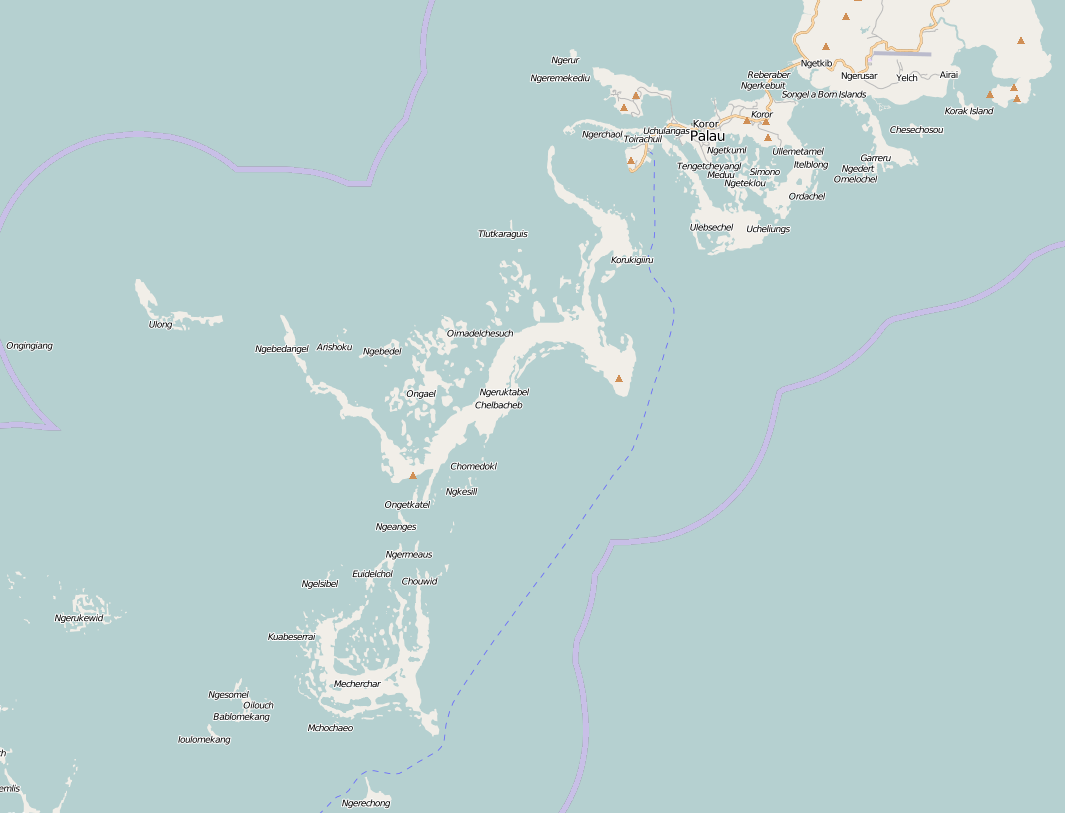
Click twice to view clearly.

Ngkesill is an island geographically located at 7.3383°N 134.5550°E of Palau.
