= German Channel =

Channel dug through reef Palau

- German Wall
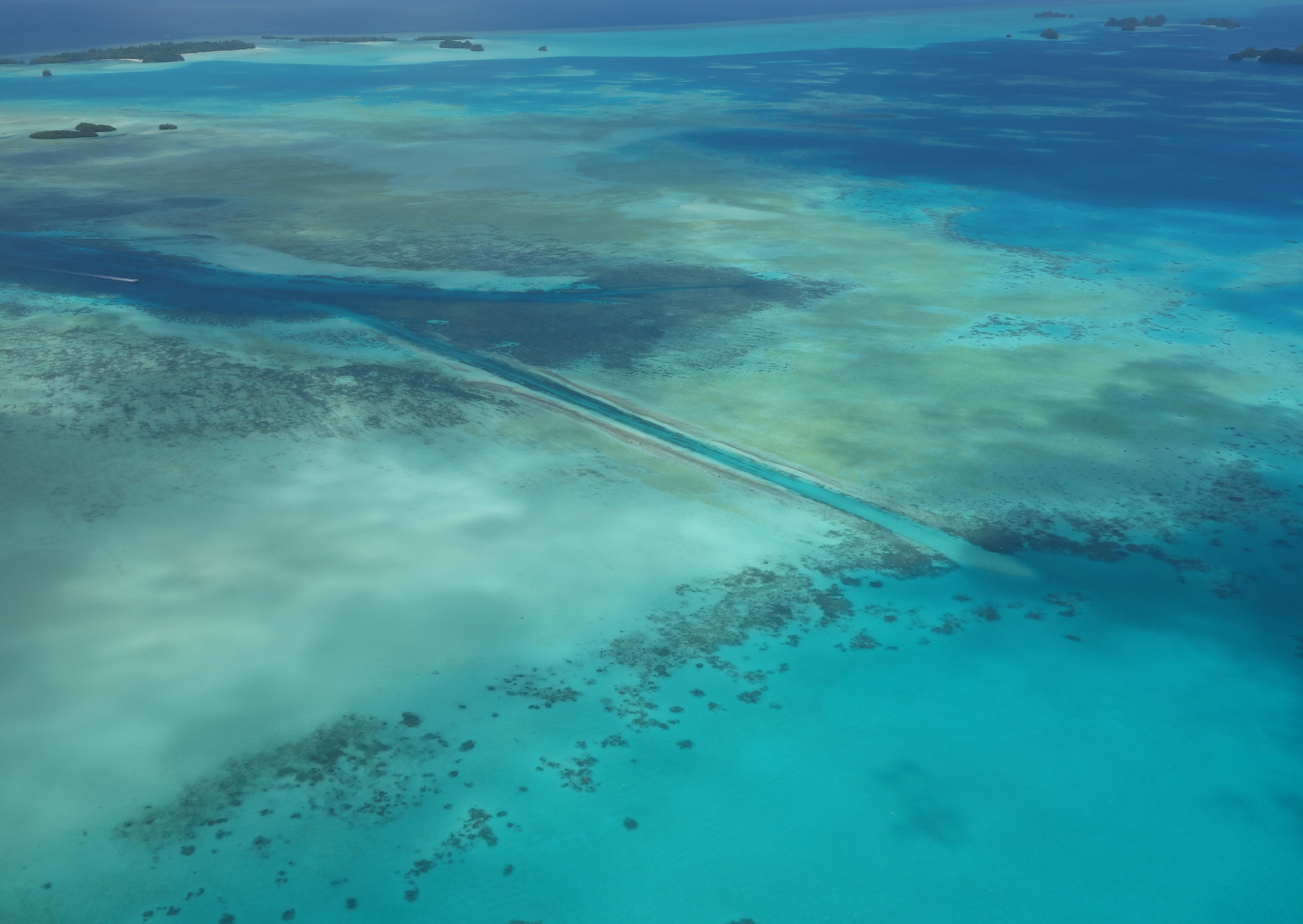
- Aerial view of German Channel

- Location within Oceania
- Location: Koror, Palau
- Nearest land: Ngemelis Island
- Coordinates: 7°07′38″N 134°17′03″E
- Dive type: Open-water
- Depth range: 3 to 40 m (9.8 to 131.2 ft)
- Average visibility: 60 ft (18 m)
- Entry type: Boat
- Bottom composition: Sand, coral

The German Channel is an artificial channel dug into the southwest side of Palau's barrier reef that connects the lagoon to the Pacific Ocean. The channel was made by the Germans around the end of 1908, during the time when Palau was a German colony, to shorten the transport route from the island of Angaur, located outside the reef and where phosphate was mined, to the northeastern port of Koror. Presently, it is a popular dive site.

== See also ==
- Rock Islands
- Blue Corner
