= Chouwid =

Island of Palau

Coordinates: 7°11′22″N 134°22′52″E

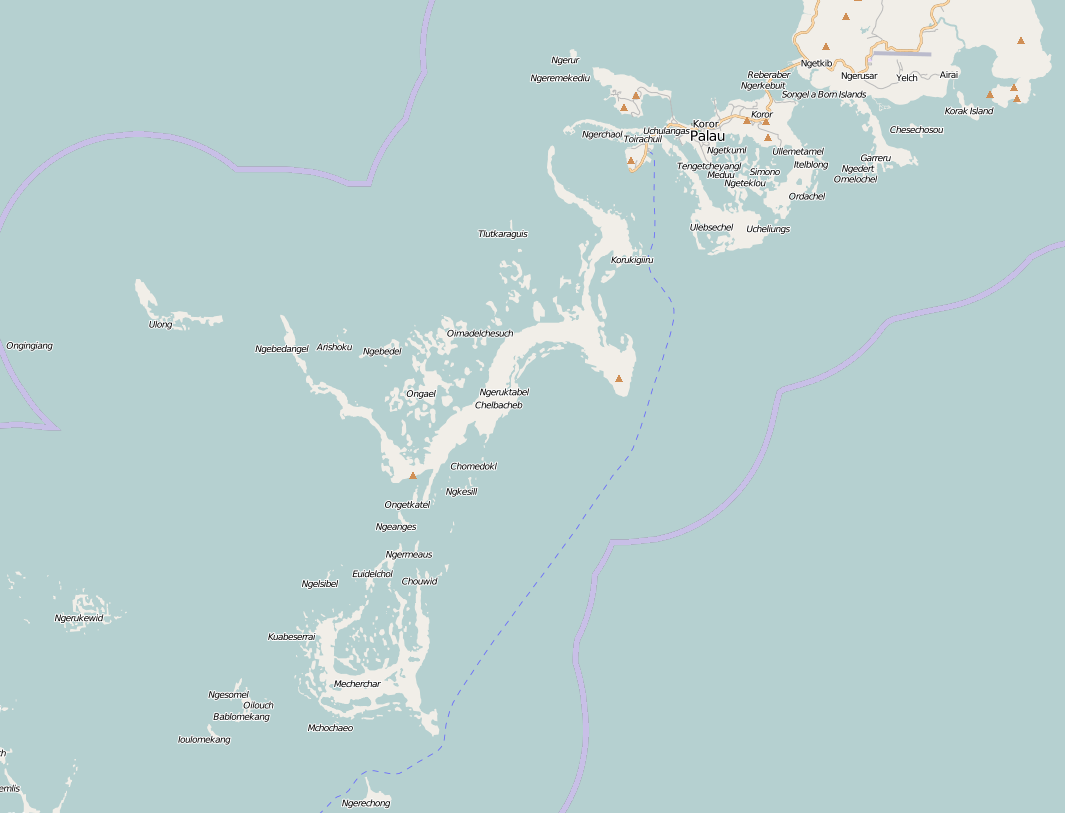
Click twice to view clearly.

Chouwid is an island of Palau.
