= Blue Holes (Saudi Arabia) =

Marine sinkholes discovered during the Red Sea Decade Expedition

The blue holes of Saudi Arabia are a series of more than twenty deep marine sinkhole formations located along the southern coast of the Red Sea. They were discovered during the Red Sea Decade Expedition, a multi-year oceanographic survey led by the National Center for Wildlife (NCW) in partnership with Saudi and international research institutions. The expedition used advanced seafloor mapping, remotely operated vehicles, and oceanographic instruments to identify and document these formations, which exhibit steep vertical walls, unique hydrological conditions, and distinct biological communities.

== Geography and location ==
The Blue Holes of Saudi Arabia are located along the southern sector of the Red Sea coast, primarily south of the city of Jazan and near the Afifi and Farasan regions. The formations occur along the continental shelf, where steep drop-offs and complex reef structures create conditions favorable for deep vertical sinkholes. Most of the identified sites lie several kilometers offshore, embedded within coral reef systems and adjacent to deep-water channels.

Bathymetric surveys conducted during the Red Sea Decade Expedition revealed that the blue holes vary significantly in diameter and depth, with some extending hundreds of meters below sea level. Their distribution is irregular, occurring in isolated depressions rather than in a continuous chain, which reflects the geological complexity of the southern Red Sea basin.

Initial findings from the expedition revealed more than twenty distinct blue hole formations, many of which had not been previously recorded in scientific literature or nautical maps. These formations vary in size, depth, and geomorphology, and are now regarded as significant geological and ecological features within Saudi Arabia’s marine environment.

== Designation as a marine protected area ==
In 2025, the Government of Saudi Arabia designated the Blue Holes as an official marine protected area following approval by the Council of Ministers.

The protected area status contributes to national targets under the Saudi Green Initiative, including the aim to conserve 30% of the Kingdom’s marine and terrestrial environments by 2030. The Blue Holes include sensitive coral, fish nursery habitats, and deep-water ecological systems. Protection measures focus on regulating activity, enabling controlled scientific research, and preserving biodiversity for long-term study.

== Ecology and biodiversity ==
The Blue Holes host a range of marine habitats that differ from the surrounding shallow-reef environments. Surveys conducted during the Red Sea Decade Expedition documented coral communities, sponge assemblages, and fish nurseries along the upper walls of several sinkholes, where light penetration remains sufficient for photosynthetic species.

Deeper sections of the blue holes contain low-light and low-oxygen conditions that support microbial communities and deep-water organisms not typically present in coastal reef systems. These gradients create distinct ecological zones within each formation, allowing for a high degree of biological diversity over short vertical distances.

The surrounding areas are also used by larger marine species, including sea turtles, reef fish, and marine mammals, which rely on adjacent reefs and deep-water channels for feeding and movement.

== See also ==
- Marine geology
- Oceanography
- Physical oceanography
