= Bablomekang =

Island in Palau

Coordinates: 7°08′N 134°19′E

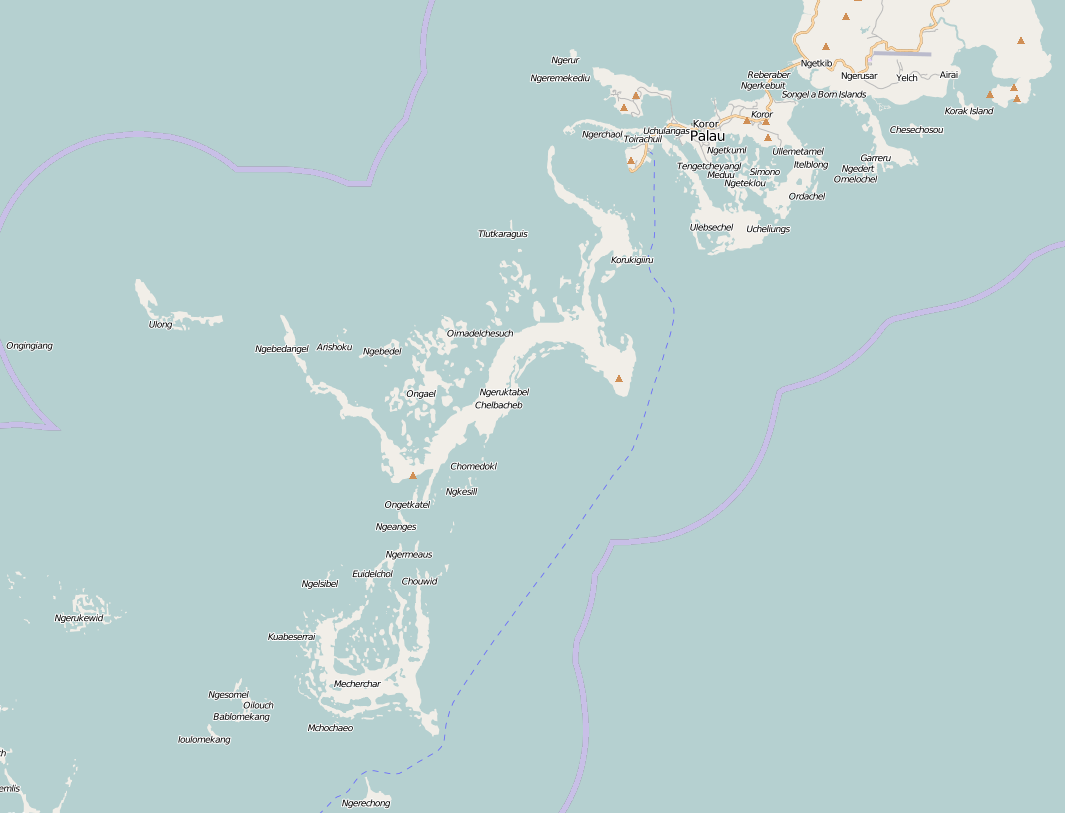
Southern Palau. Bablomekang shown south west.

Bablomekang is an island in the Rock Islands of Palau. It was last inhabited 2004, when inhabitants decided to move due to floodings.
