= Blue Corner =

Dive site of Palau

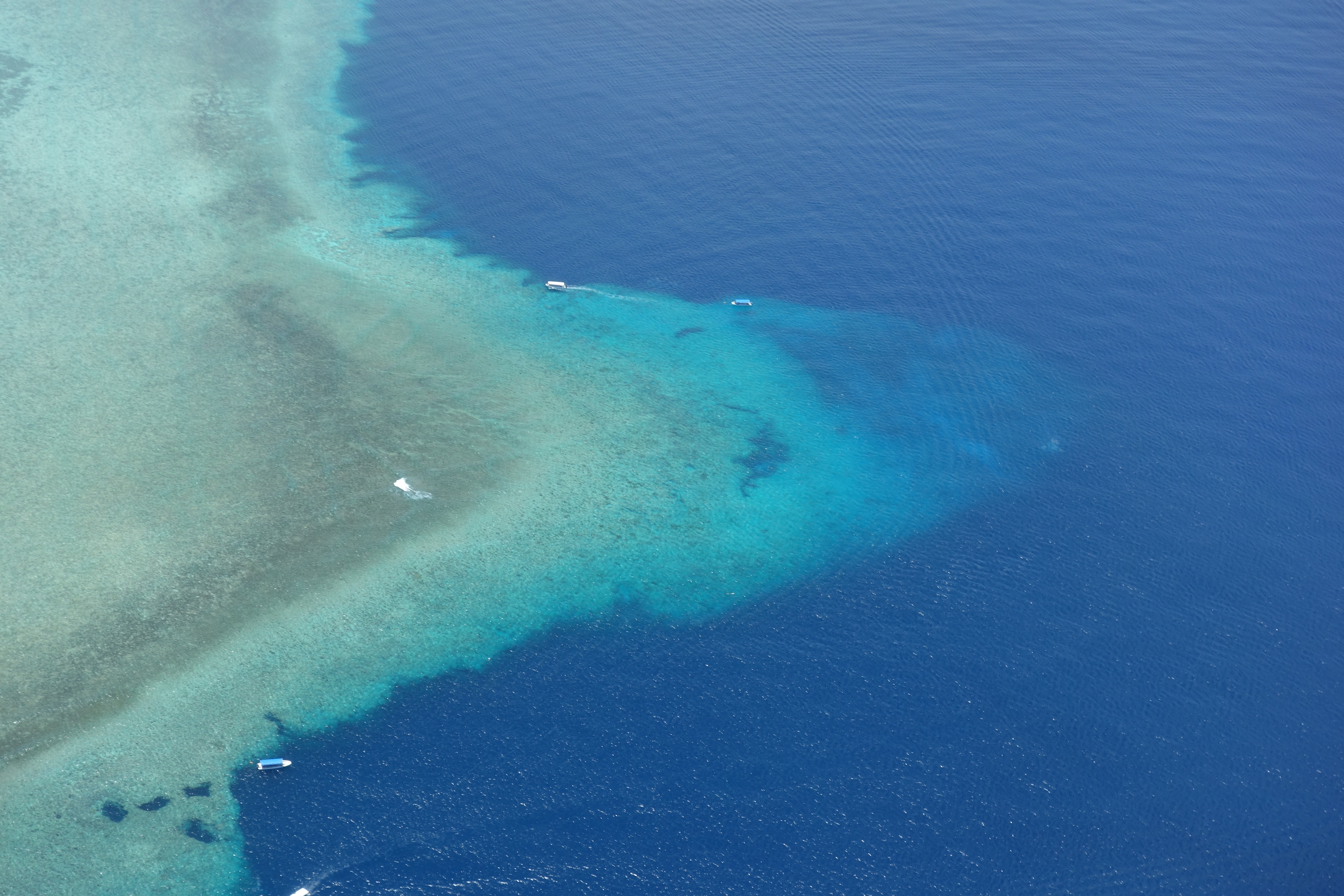
- Aerial view of Blue Corner

- Location within Oceania
- Location: Koror, Palau
- Nearest land: Ngemelis Island, Rock Islands
- Coordinates: 7°08′01″N 134°13′13″E
- Dive type: Open-water
- Depth range: 25 to 100 ft (7.6 to 30.5 m)
- Average visibility: Incoming tide: 90 ft (27 m); Outgoing tide: 45 to 60 ft (14 to 18 m)
- Entry type: Boat
- Bottom composition: Coral
- Nearby sites: Blue Holes, Clarence Wall

Blue Corner is a section of Palau's barrier reef in the south-east of Koror, close to Ngerukewid and German Channel. Its triangular shape, with step walls on the Pacific Ocean sides, resembles a submerged peninsula. In the north part of the Blue Corner, there is a large underwater cavern called Blue Holes. Due to a high variety of corals and wildlife in the area, the Blue Corner is a popular recreational dive site. It is variously called "the most requested dive in Palau" and "one of the most action-packed scuba dive sites in the world".

== See also ==
- Rock Islands
