= Ongetkatel =

Coordinates: 7°13′N 134°22′E

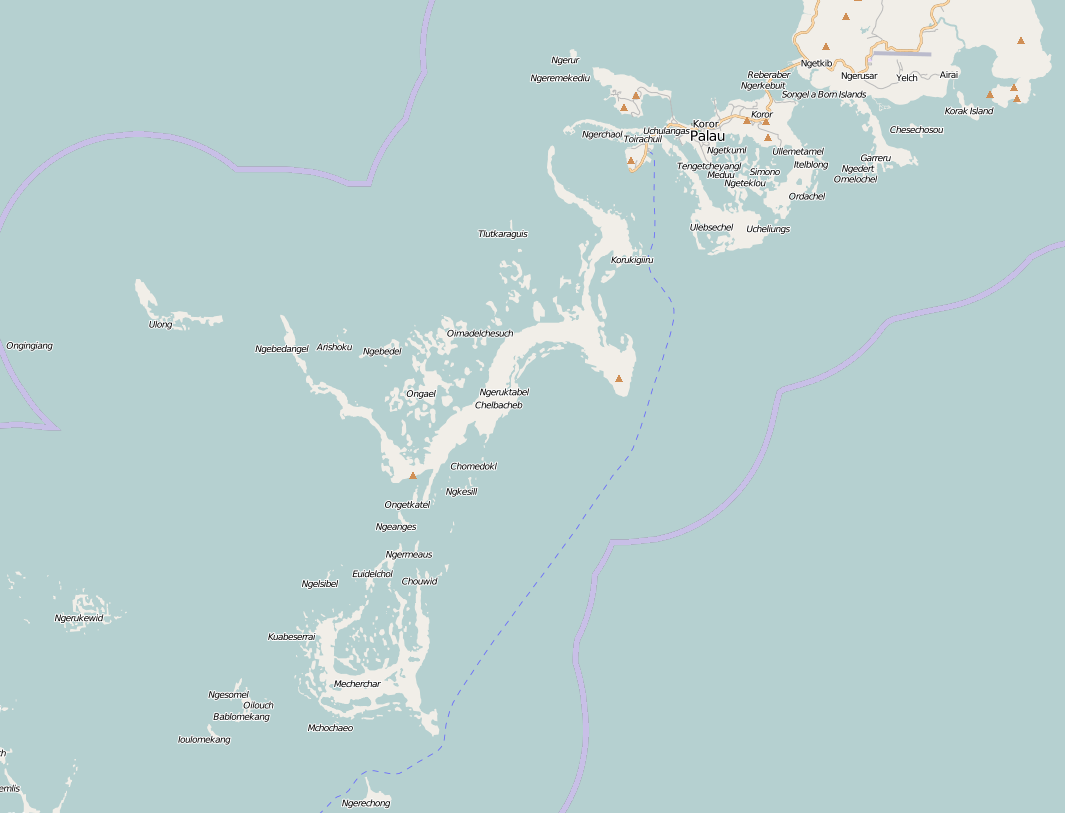
Click twice to view clearly.

Ongetkatel is a channel of water and island of Palau, administrated by the State of Koror.
