= Ngelsibel =

Island in Palau

Coordinates: 7°11′N 134°21′E

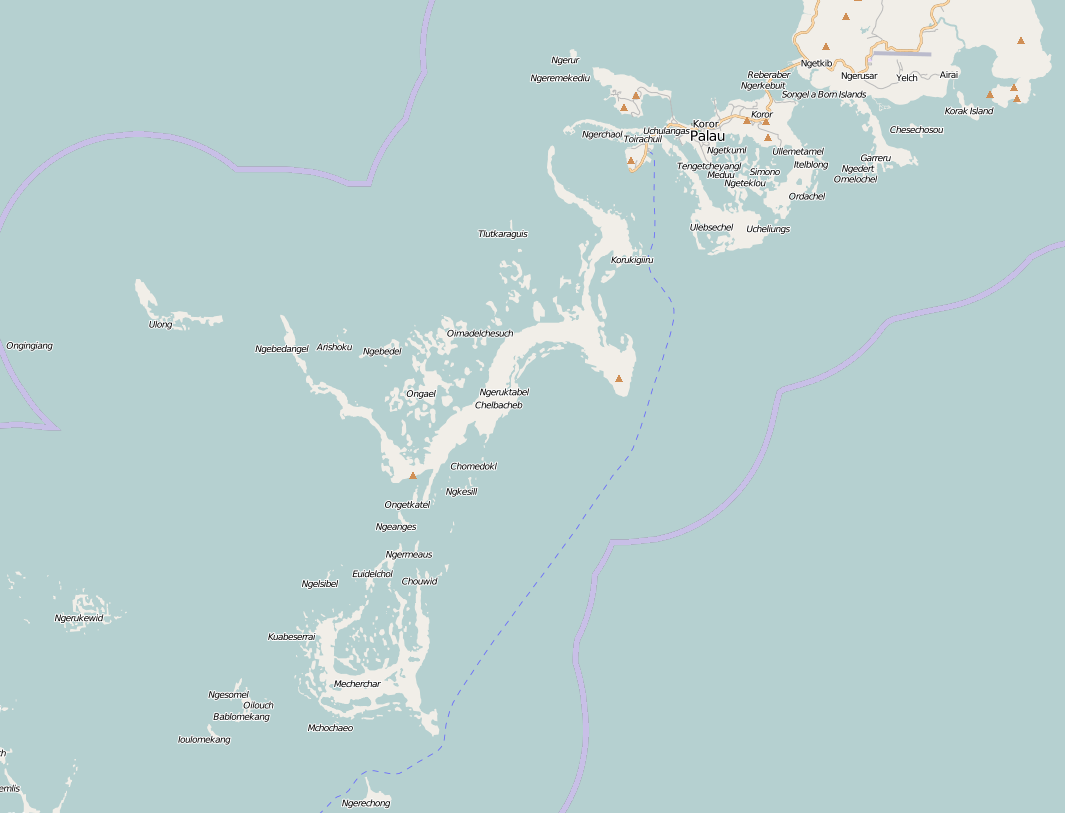
Click twice to view clearly.

Ngelsibel is an island of Palau.
