= Chomedokl =

Island in Palau

Coordinates: 7°14′N 134°24′E

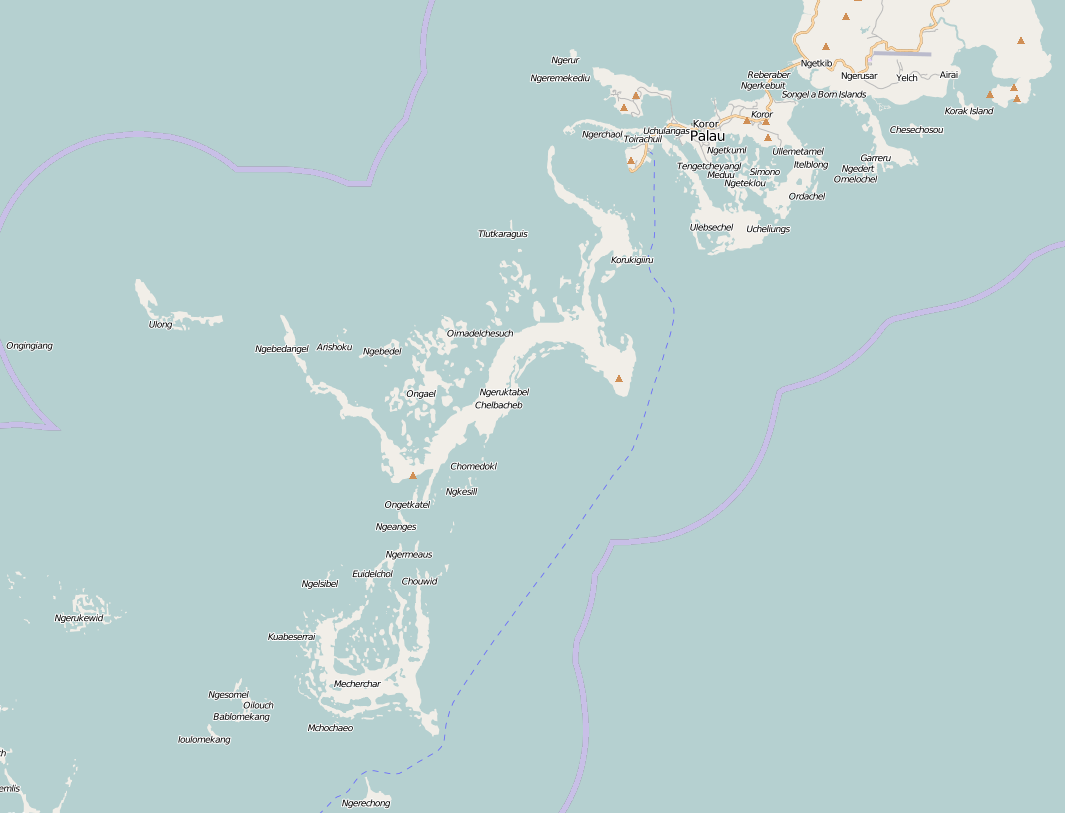
Click twice to view clearly.

Chomedokl is an island of Palau. It is most known for its north cave entrance, which is a World Heritage Site listed by UNESCO.
