= San Antonio Springs =

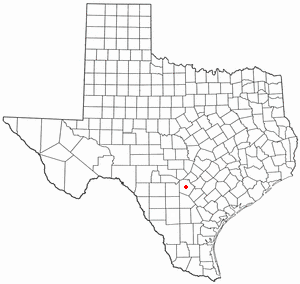
- Location of San Antonio Springs
- Interactive map of San Antonio Springs
- Location: San Antonio, Texas, USA
- Coordinates: 29.468889°N 98.467500°W
- Spring source: Edwards Aquifer
- Elevation: 680 feet (210 m) above sea level
- Type: Karst springs
- Provides water for: San Antonio River
- Magnitude: 2
- Discharge: 20 cubic feet (570 L)/s

San Antonio Springs (also known as the Blue Hole) is a cluster of springs in Bexar County, Texas. These springs provide a large portion of the water for the San Antonio River, which flows from San Antonio to the Gulf of Mexico. The San Pedro Springs also feed into the San Antonio River.

== Geography ==
The San Antonio Springs are located about three miles (5 km) north of Downtown San Antonio; most are now on the property of the University of the Incarnate Word in the Midtown Brackenridge district of San Antonio. The springs are fed by water from the Edwards Aquifer; this water reaches the surface through faults along the Balcones Escarpment. There have been more than 100 individual springs identified, but many of these are no longer active due to pumping demands on the Edwards Aquifer and sedimentation from the upstream Olmos Creek, although sedimentation has been partially mitigated by the Olmos Dam since 1926. During periods of drought, the springs sometimes stop flowing entirely, only to resume when water levels rise in the aquifer. The mean flow from the springs is 20 ft^{3}/s (0.6 m^{3}/s).

== History ==
Artifacts from Paleo-Indian cultures have been found at the site of the San Antonio Springs; some of these artifacts are more than 11,000 years old.

The earliest Europeans found up to 200 sub-bands of Coahuiltecan Indians in the vicinity of the springs; however, they were soon displaced by the Lipan Apaches. Spanish missionaries built a system of aqueducts and canals to carry water from the springs to the local missions, including The Alamo.

By the Civil War, the springs had become contaminated. In 1891, artesian wells were drilled to provide clean water for the city.

== Gallery ==
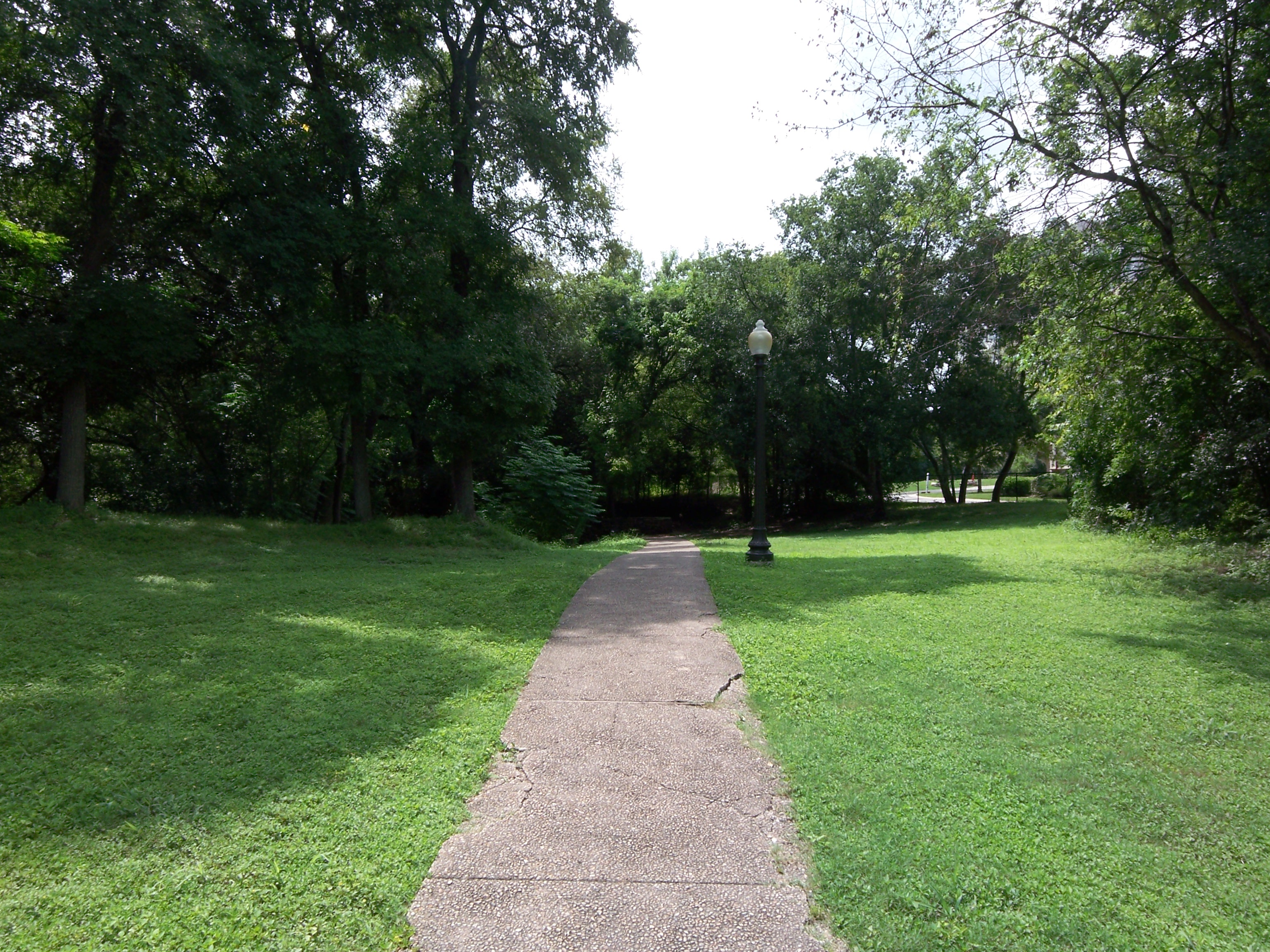
Entrance to the springs area

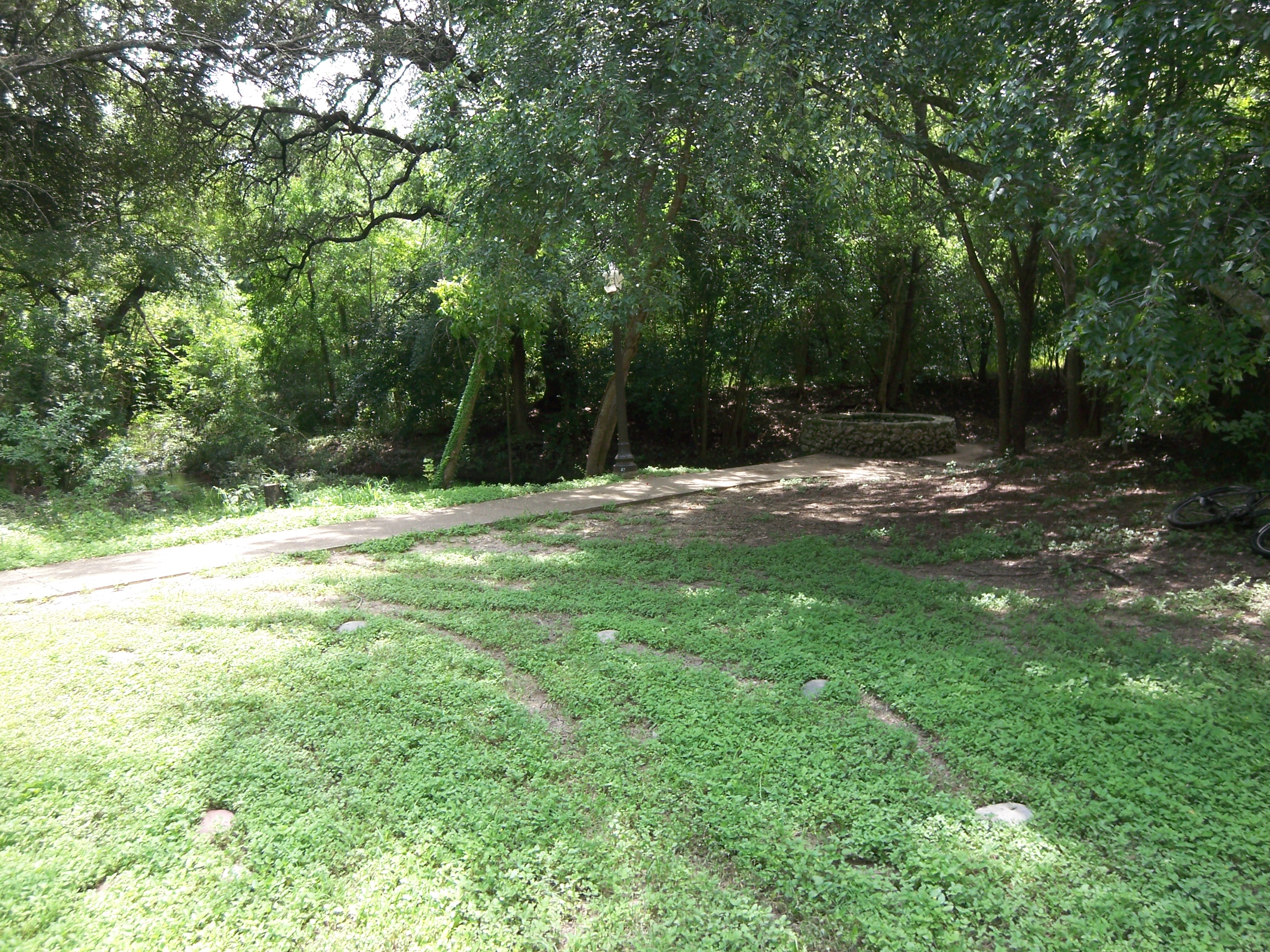
The largest spring, The Blue Hole

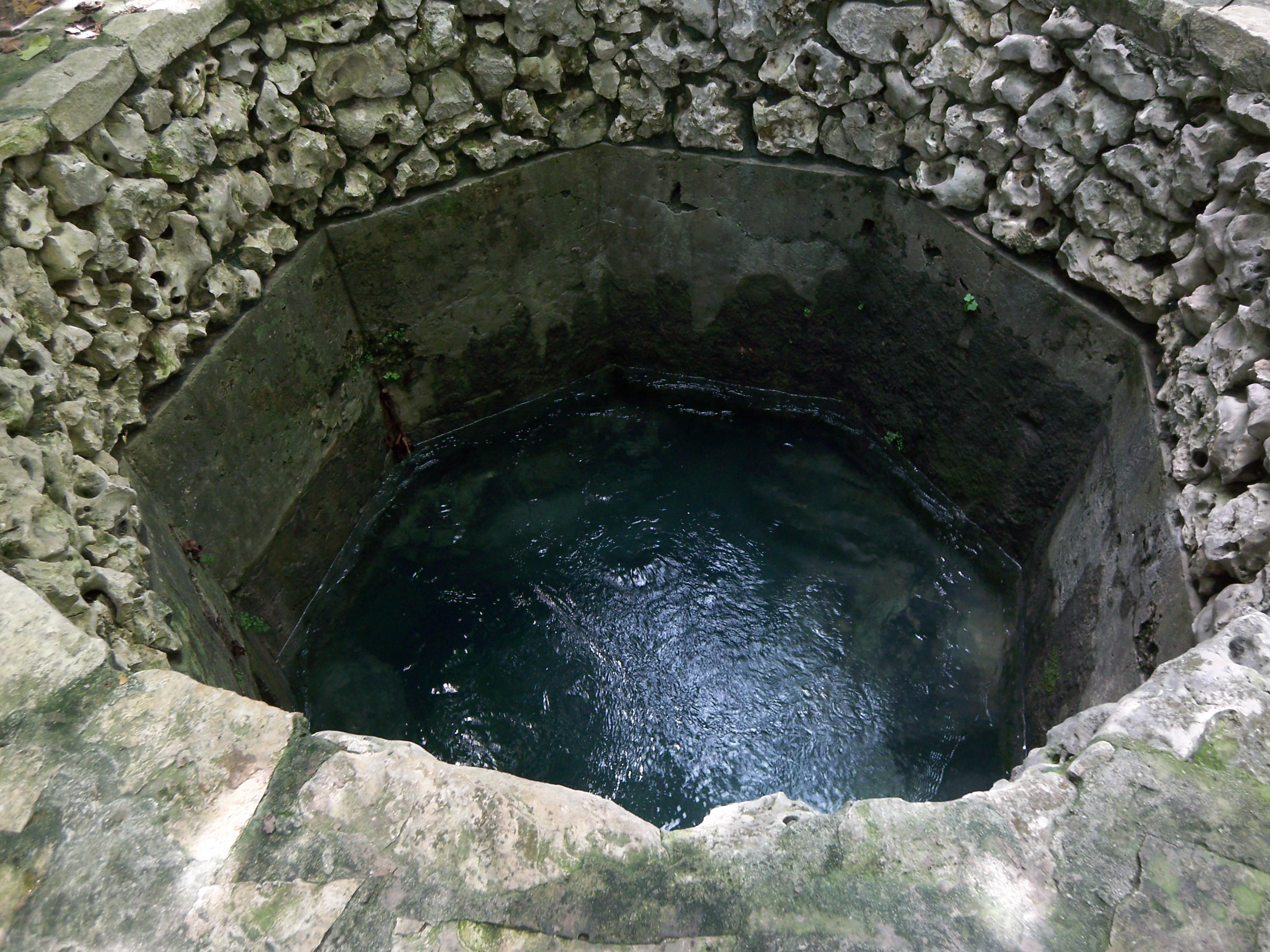
High water levels due to recent rains

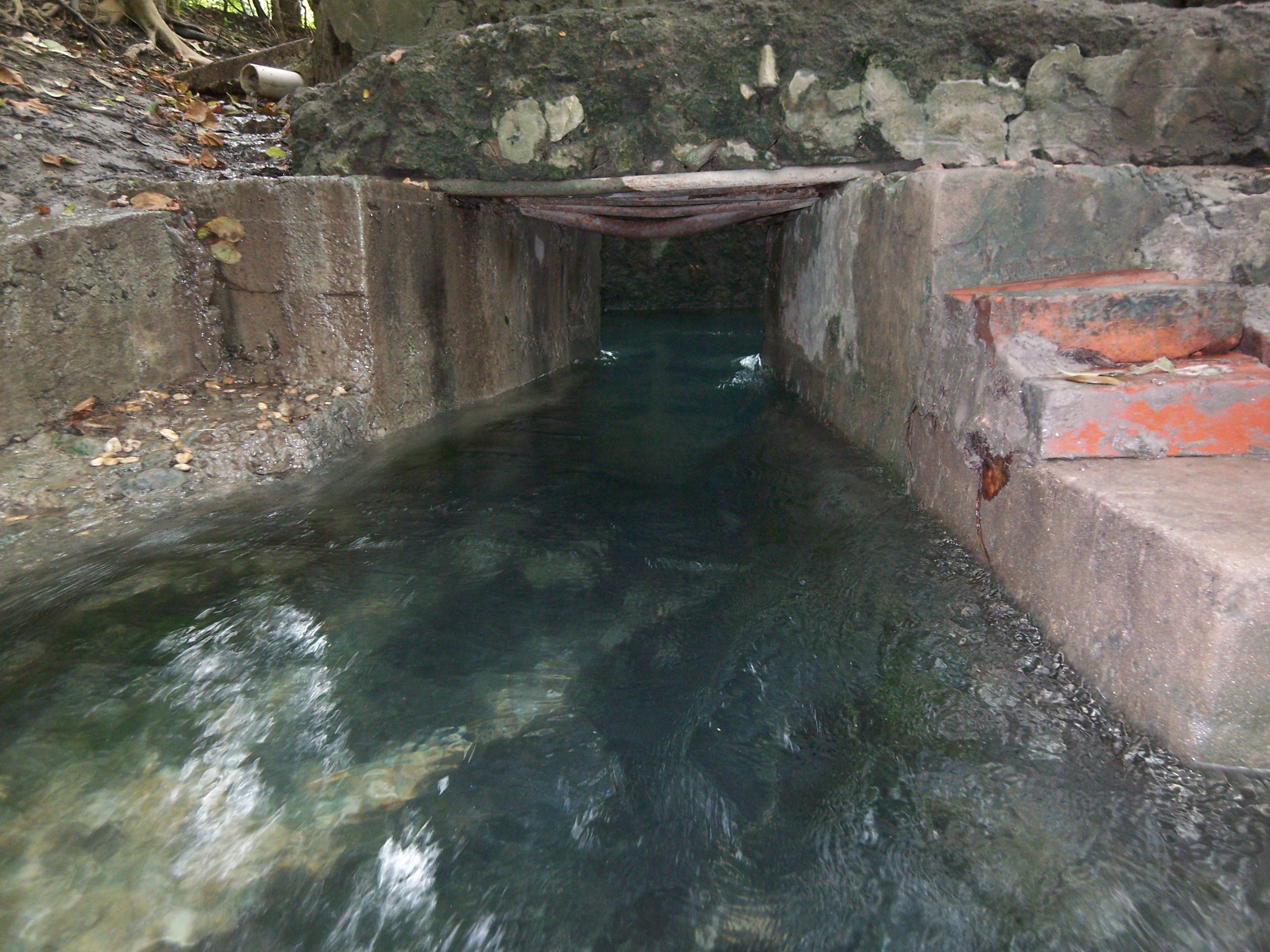
Spring water pouring out of the mouth of The Blue Hole

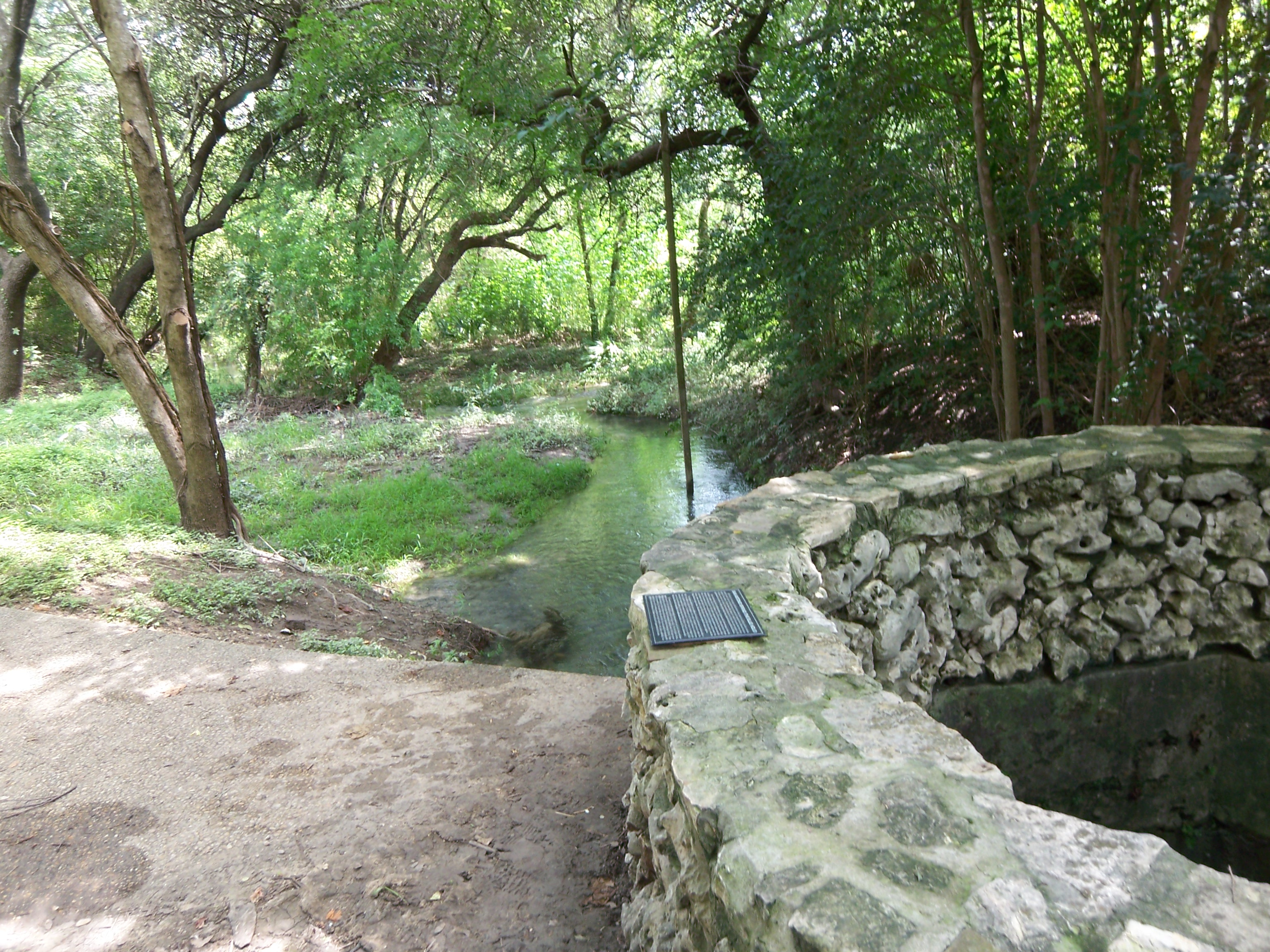
Water flows downstream

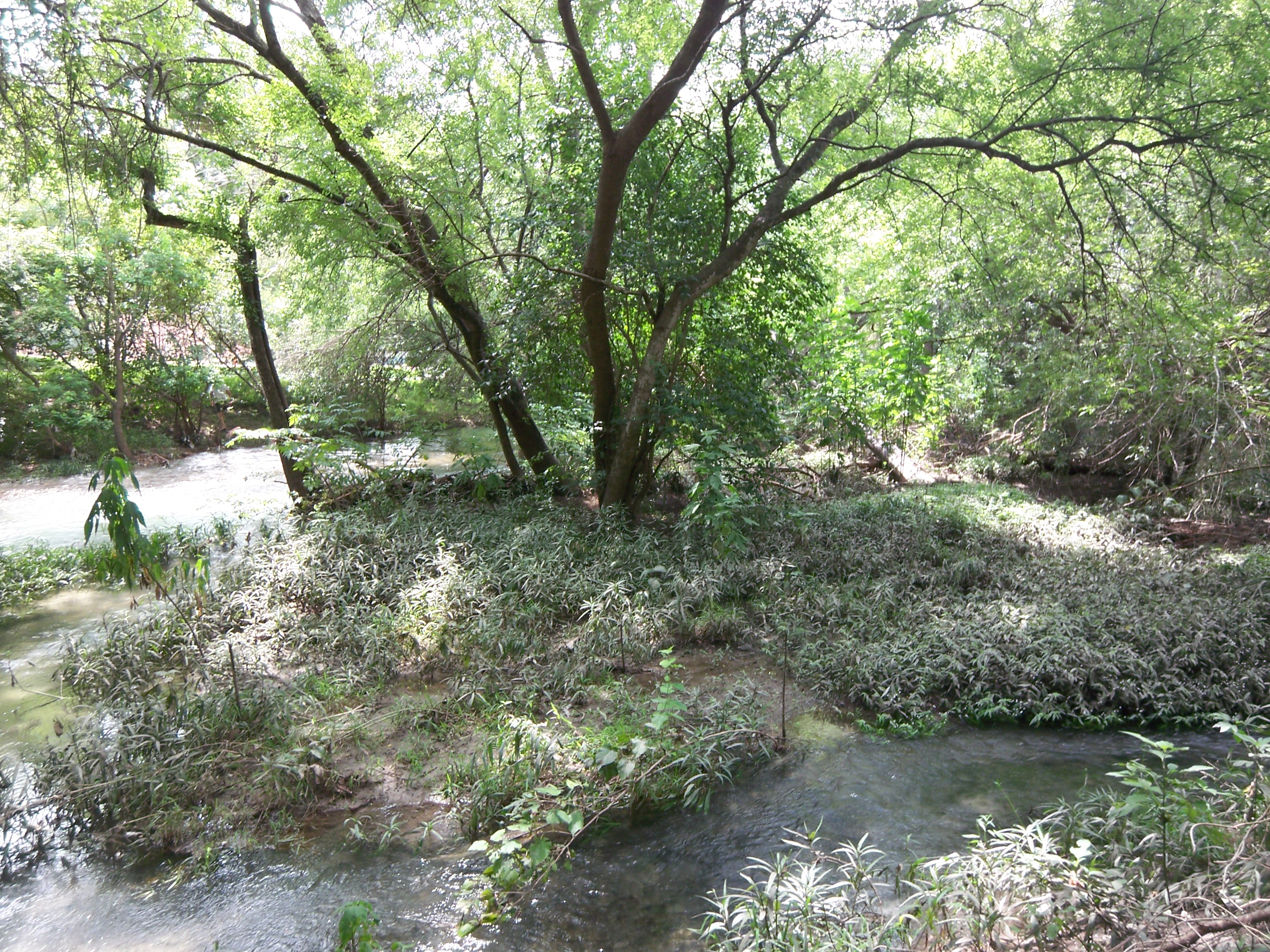
Additional, smaller springs

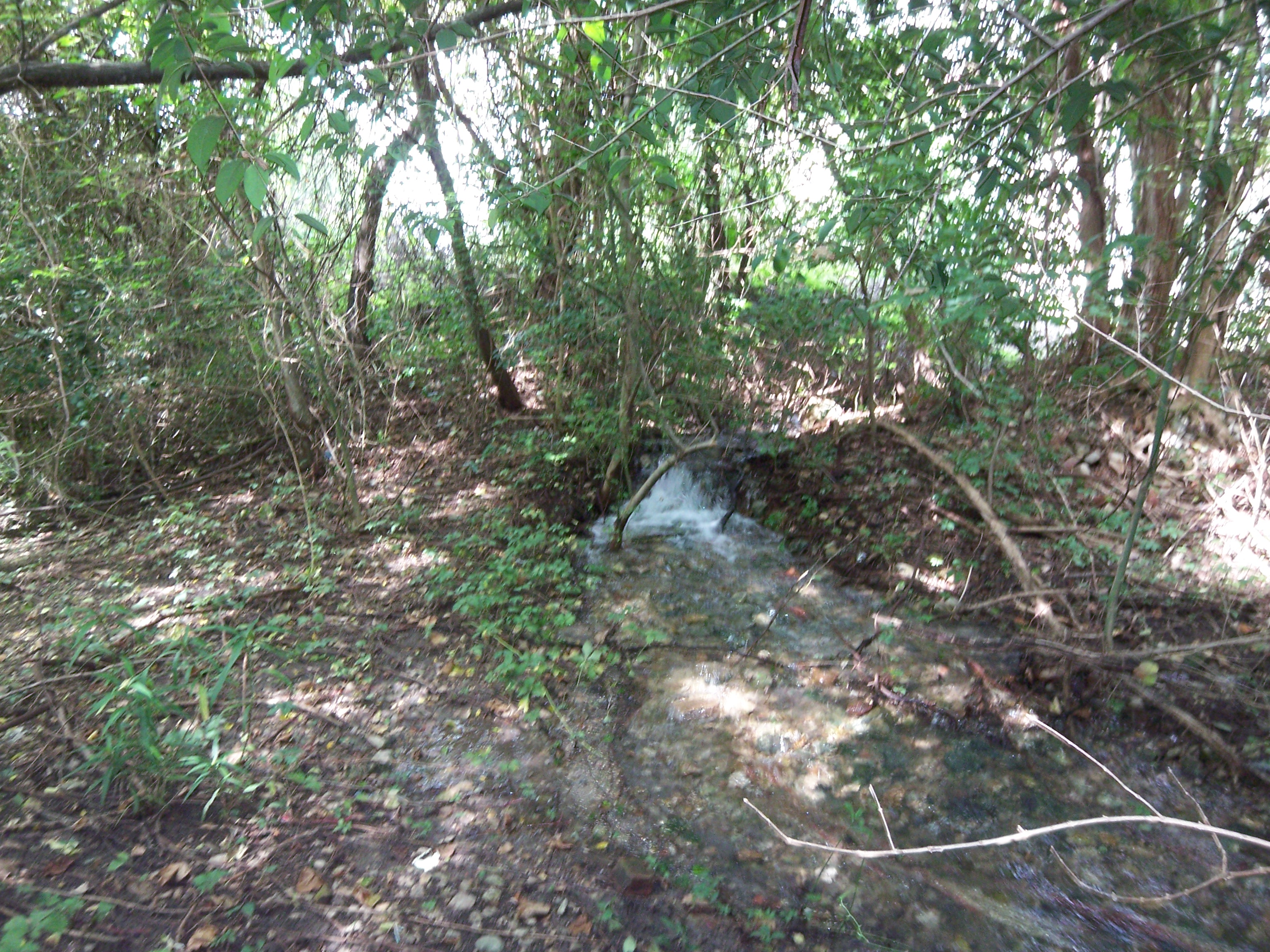
More springs

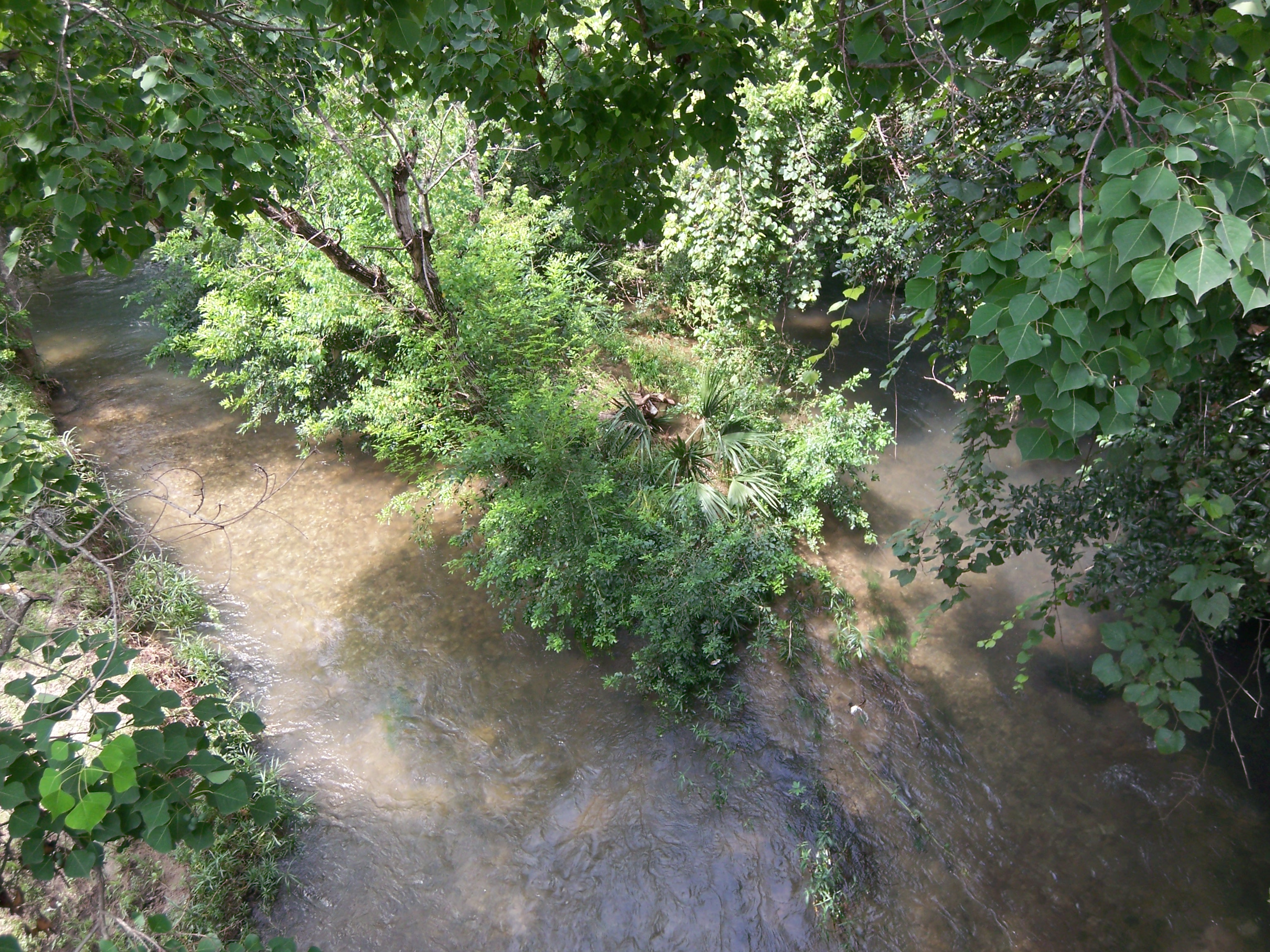
Olmos Creek (left) joins with San Antonio Springs (right) to form the San Antonio River
