= Ngerukewid =

Island group in Palau

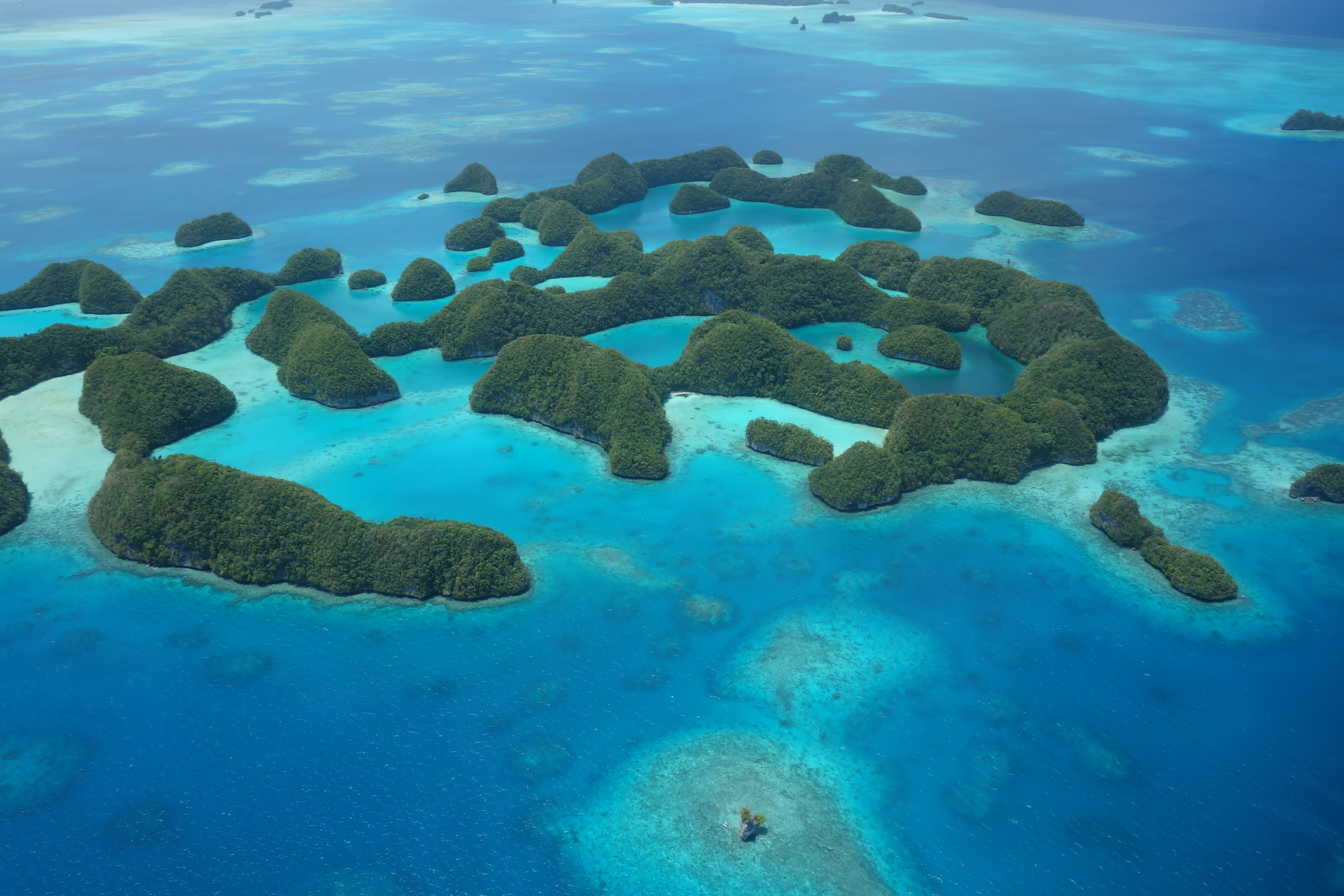
- Aerial view of Ngerukewid.
- Interactive map of Ngerukewid

Geography
- Location: Palau, Pacific Ocean
- Coordinates: 7°10′34″N 134°15′52″E
- Total islands: 37
- Area: 0.873 km^{2} (0.337 sq mi)

Administration
- Palau
- State: Koror

Ngerukewid or Ngerukeuid (also known as Orukuizu) is a set of islands located inside the Palau's lagoon. The set contains 37 small raised coral islands, which range in size from 0.1 to 48.5 ha, and amount to total land area of 87.3 ha. The islands and the area around them are protected under the Ngerukewid Islands Wildlife Reserve, which was established in 1956.

== See also ==
- Rock Islands
