= Ngeruktabel =

Island in Palau

- Location within Palau

Geography
- Location: South Pacific
- Coordinates: 7°16′22.8″N 134°25′30.01″E
- Archipelago: Rock Islands
- Area: 18.62 km^{2} (7.19 sq mi)
- Coastline: 91.55 km (56.887 mi)
- Highest elevation: 215 m (705 ft)

Administration
- Palau
- State: Koror

Demographics
- Population: 0

Ngeruktabel is an island of the Koror state of Palau in the South Pacific.

== Geography and history ==
Ngeruktabel is the second largest island of Palau and the largest one of the Rock Islands. Like other Rock Islands, Ngeruktabel is uninhabited today. However, the local oral history identifies at least five ancient villages existing in the late prehistoric times. The local population migrated northward to Koror and Babeldaob. Depopulation is recorded as being primarily associated with warfare.
