= Rock Islands =

Collection of reef islands in Palau

Chelbacheb
Nickname: Rock Islands
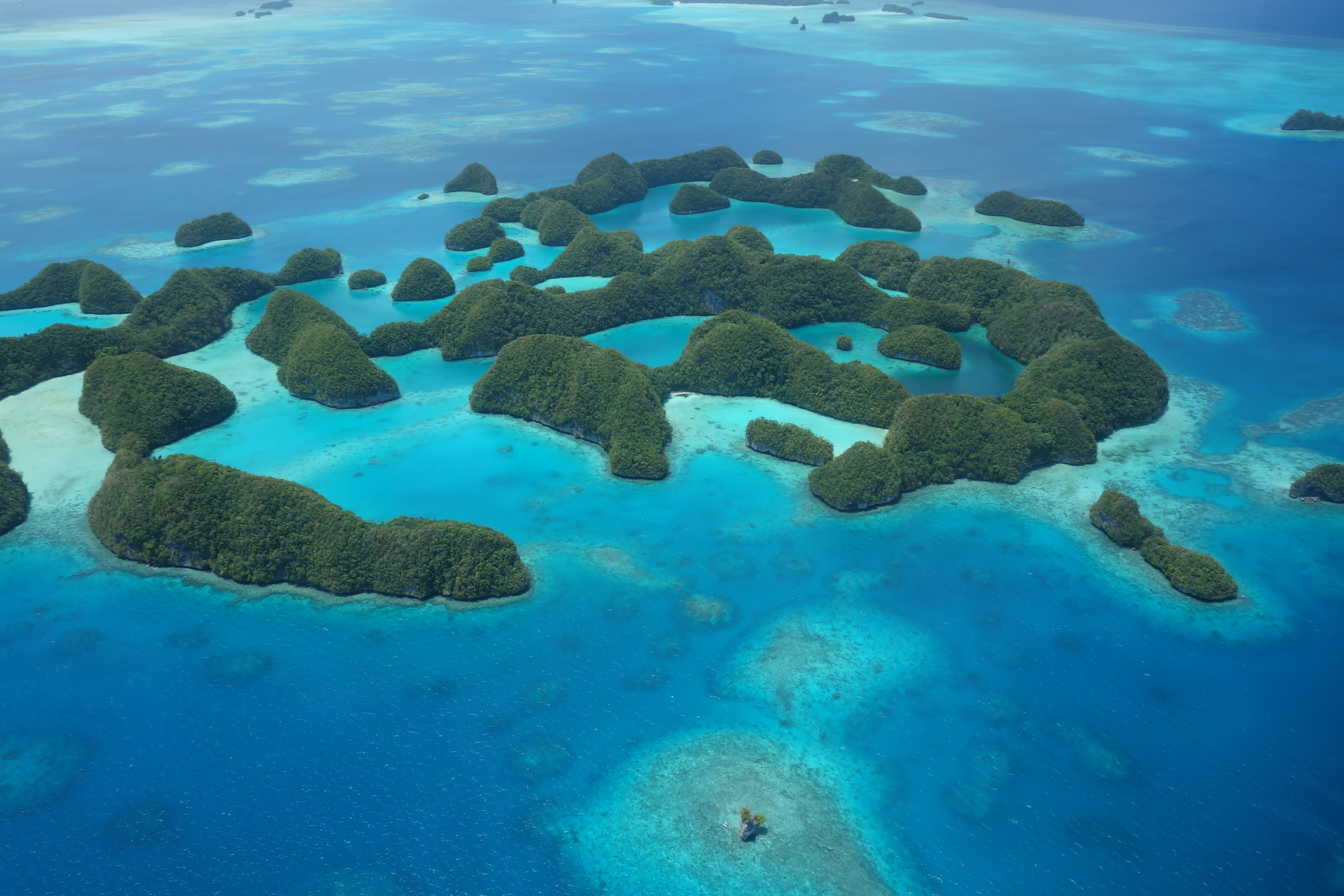
- Aerial view of Ngerukewid

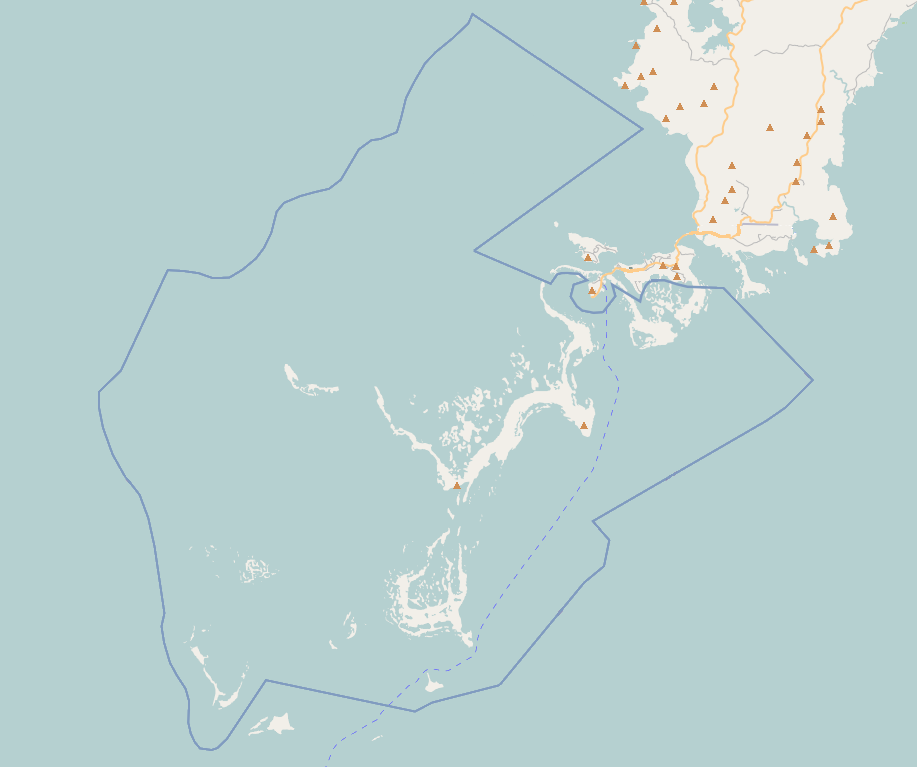
- Map of the Rock Islands

- Location within Palau

Geography
- Coordinates: 7°15′N 134°21′E
- Total islands: 250–300
- Area: 41.12 km^{2} (15.88 sq mi)
- Highest elevation: 207 m (679 ft)

Administration
- Palau
- State: Koror

Demographics
- Population: 6 (2014)

UNESCO World Heritage Site
- Official name: Rock Islands Southern Lagoon
- Criteria: Cultural: iii, v; Natural: vii, ix, x
- Reference: 1386
- Inscription: 2012 (36th Session)
- Area: 100,200 ha (248,000 acres)
- Buffer zone: 164,000 ha (410,000 acres)

The Rock Islands of Palau, also called Chelbacheb, are a collection of several hundred small limestone or coral uprises in the Southern Lagoon of Palau between Koror and Peleliu, now an incorporated part of Koror State. There are between 250 and 300 islands in the group according to different sources, with an aggregate area of 42 square kilometers (16 sq mi) and a maximum height of 207 meters (679 ft). The islands were declared a UNESCO World Heritage Site in 2012.

== Geography ==
The Rock Islands are sparsely populated and famous for their beaches, blue lagoons, and the peculiar umbrella-like shapes of many of the islands themselves. Many of the islands display a mushroom-like shape with a narrower base at the intertidal notch. The indentation comes from erosion and from the dense community of sponges, bivalves, chitons, snails, urchins, and others that graze mostly on algae. Also, the islands have been shaped over time by weather wind and vegetation. Notable islands in the group are:

- Eil Malk (Mecherchar)
- Ngeruktabel
- Ulong
- Bablomekang (Abappaomogan)
- Bukrrairong (Kamori)
- Oilouch
- Ongael
- Ngebedangel (Ngobasangel)
- Ngerukewid (Orukuizu)
- Ngeanges
- Ngeteklou (Gologugeul)
- Tlutkaraguis (Adorius)

== Environment ==
=== Important Bird Area ===
A 4,912 ha site encompassing the Rock Islands has been designated an Important Bird Area (IBA) by BirdLife International because it supports populations of most of Palau's endemic birds, including Micronesian megapodes, Palau ground doves, Micronesian imperial pigeons, Palau fruit doves, swiftlets and kingfishers, Micronesian myzomelas, morningbirds, Palau fantails, flycatchers and bush warblers, giant, dusky and citrine white-eyes, and Micronesian starlings.

== Tourism ==
The islands and surrounding reefs include Palau's most popular tourist sites, such as the Blue Corner, Blue Holes, German Channel, Ngermeaus Island, and Jellyfish Lake, one of many marine lakes in the Rock Islands that provides home and safety for several kinds of stingless jellyfish found only in Palau. It is the most popular diving destination in Palau, offering some of the most diverse dive sites on the planet, from wall diving and high current drift dives, to manta rays and sharkfeeds, to shallow lagoons, decorated caves, and overhangs. Tourist attractions also include Dolphin Bay, where a staff of veterinarians and trainers educate guests about dolphins.

== Demographics ==
The only inhabited place on the islands is called Dolphin Bay (on Ngeruktabel, 5 km from Koror). It is the location of Palau's national aquatics park, and hosts headquarters of Palau's Park rangers.

== Gallery ==
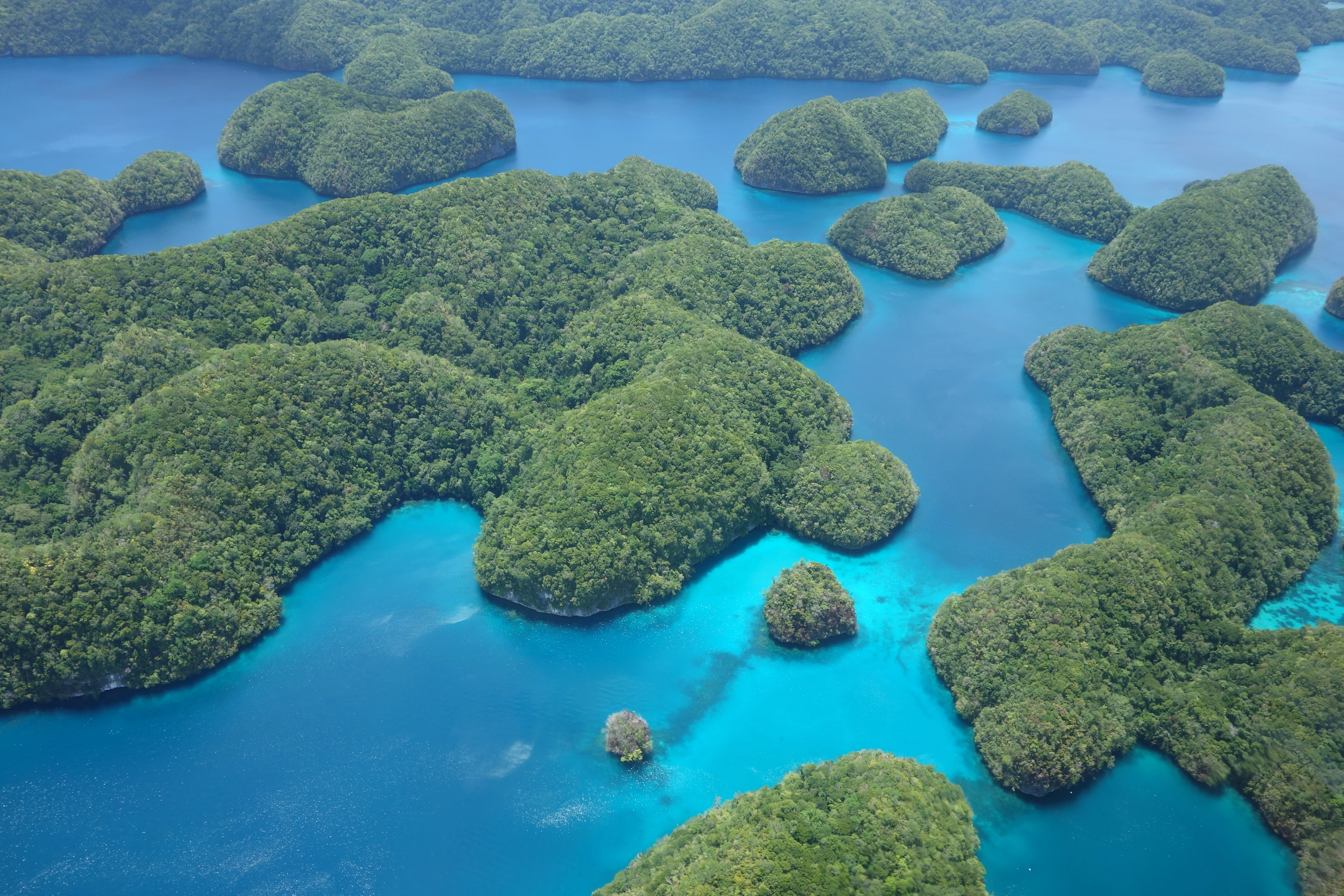
Aerial view of Rock Islands

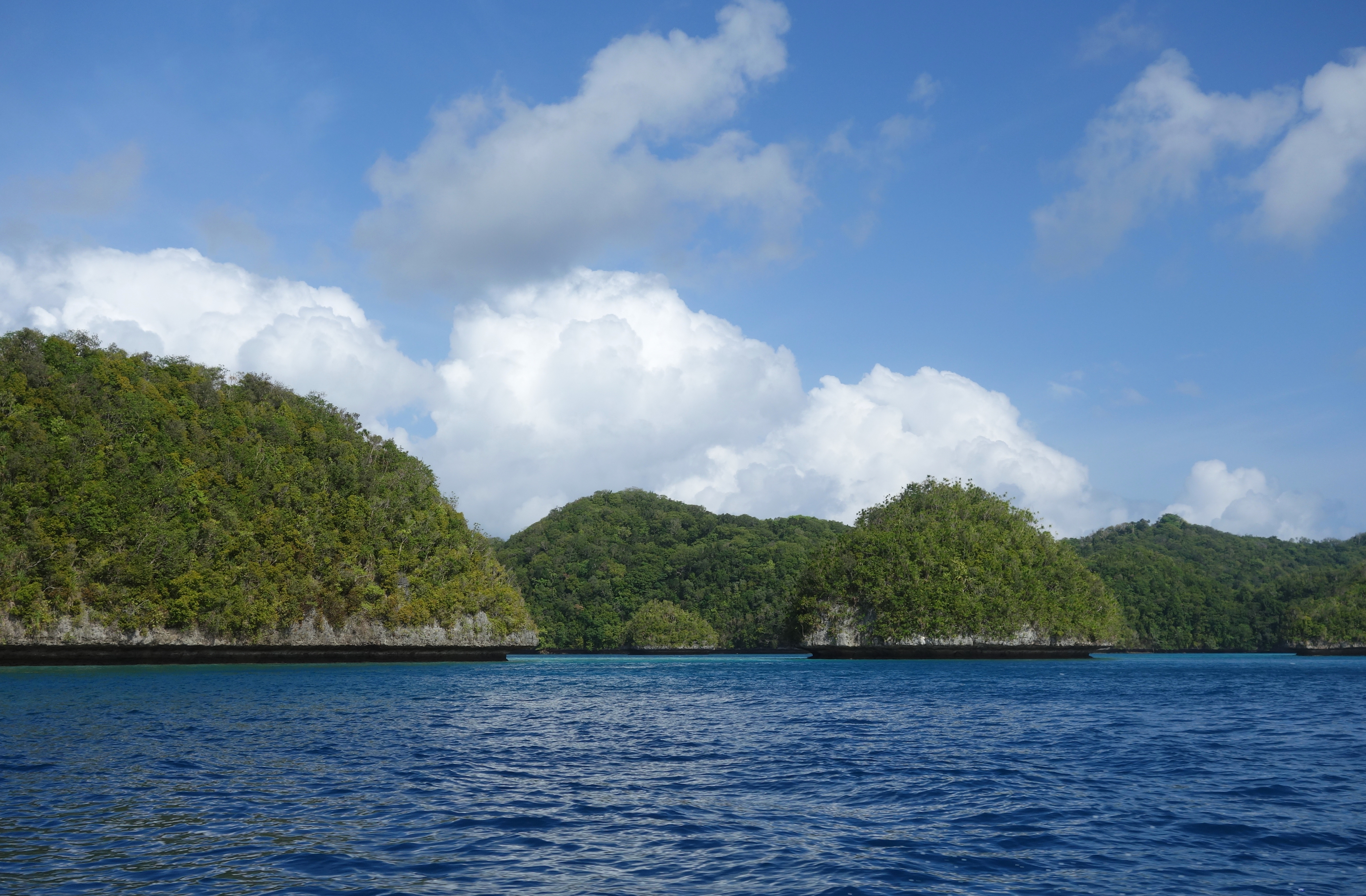
View of Rock Islands from the lagoon

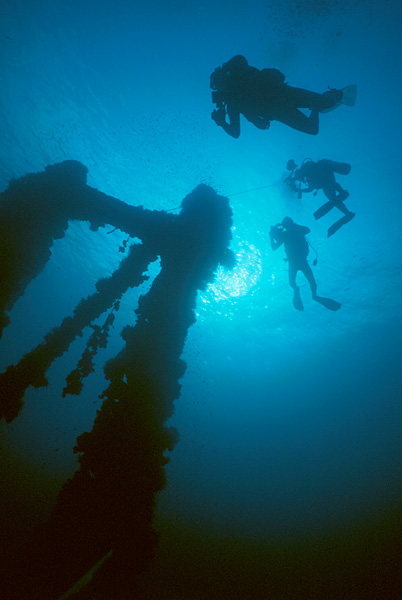
Divers descending next to the mast of the Japanese tanker Iro

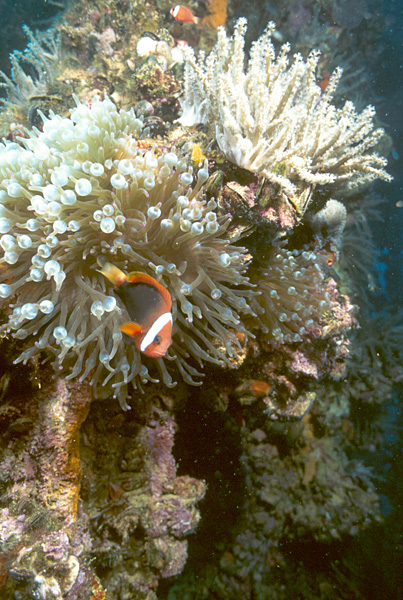
An anemonefish on the wreck of the Japanese tanker Iro

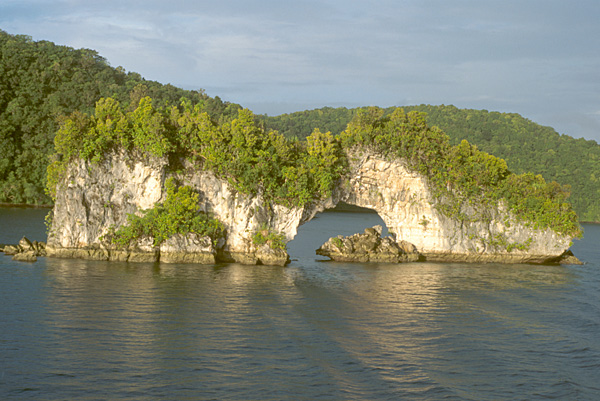
One of the many Rock Islands
