= Paragraphus =

Scientific classification
- Kingdom: Animalia
- Phylum: Arthropoda
- Class: Insecta
- Order: Coleoptera
- Suborder: Polyphaga
- Infraorder: Cucujiformia
- Family: Curculionidae
- Tribe: Agraphini
- Genus: Paragraphus; Blatchley, 1916

Genus of beetles

Paragraphus is a genus of broad-nosed weevils in the beetle family Curculionidae. There is at least one described species in Paragraphus, P. setosus.
