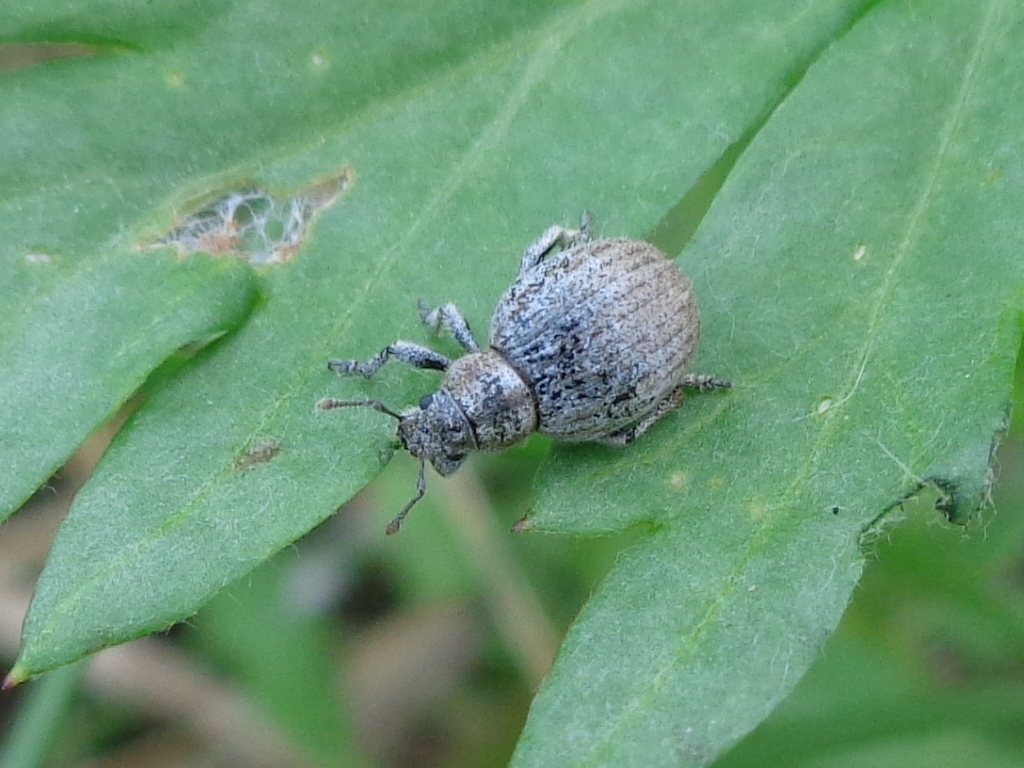
- Philopedon plagiatum

Scientific classification
- Kingdom: Animalia
- Phylum: Arthropoda
- Class: Insecta
- Order: Coleoptera
- Suborder: Polyphaga
- Infraorder: Cucujiformia
- Family: Curculionidae
- Subfamily: Entiminae
- Tribe: Cneorhinini
- Genus: Philopedon; Schönherr, 1826

= Philopedon =

Genus of beetles

Philopedon is a genus of broad-nosed weevils in the beetle family Curculionidae. There are about seven described species in Philopedon.

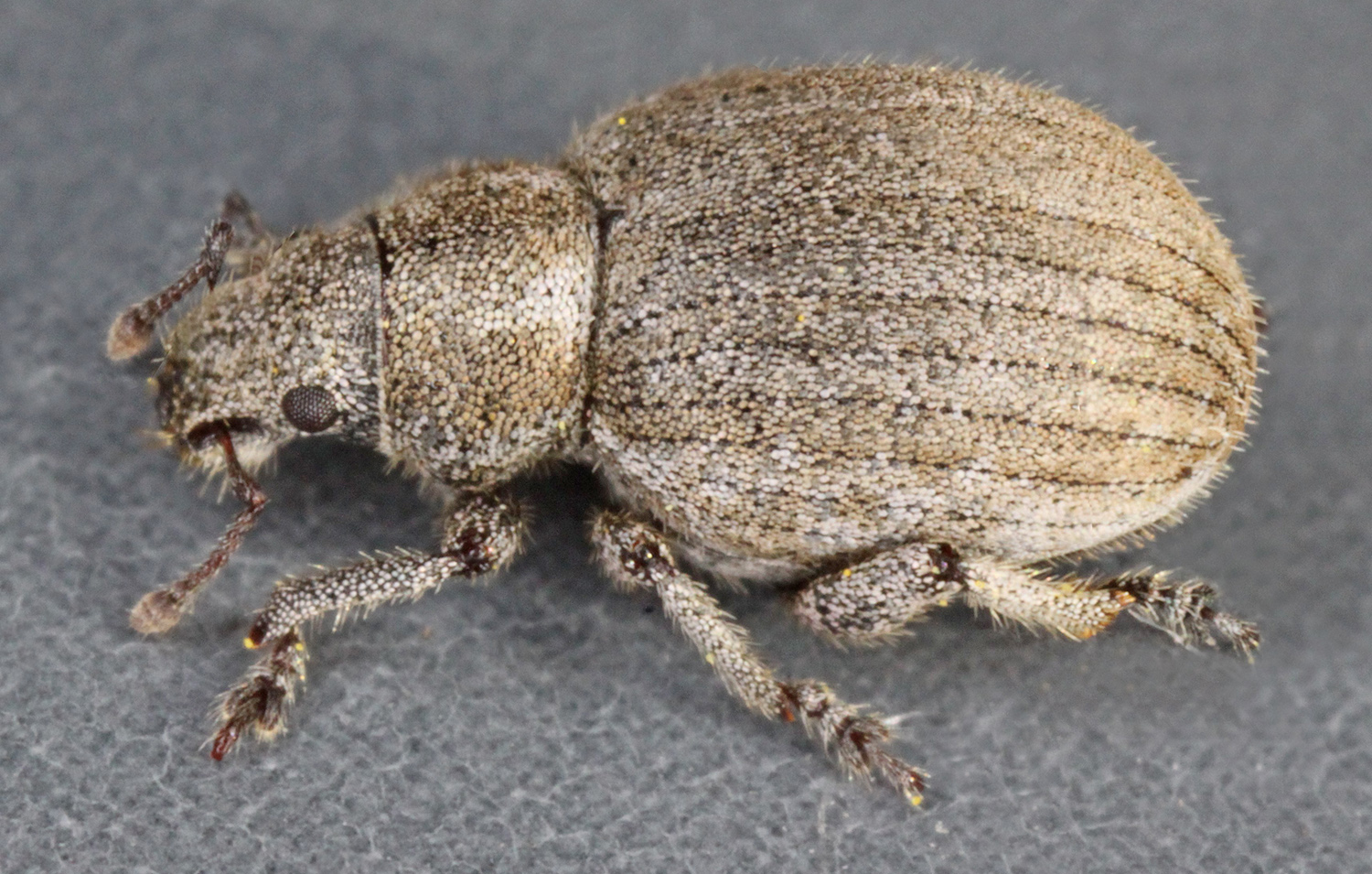
Philopedon plagiatum

== Species ==
These seven species belong to the genus Philopedon:

- Philopedon consentaneum (Desbrochers des Loges, 1907)^{c g}
- Philopedon depilatum (Desbrochers des Loges, 1904)^{c g}
- Philopedon espagnoli Viedma, 1965^{c g}
- Philopedon lasierrae Viedma, 1965^{c g}
- Philopedon plagiatum (Schaller, 1783)^{i c g b} (marram weevil)
- Philopedon tuniseum (Desbrochers des Loges, 1908)^{c g}
- Philopedon vicinum (Desbrochers des Loges, 1875)^{c g}

Data sources: i = ITIS, c = Catalogue of Life, g = GBIF, b = Bugguide.net
