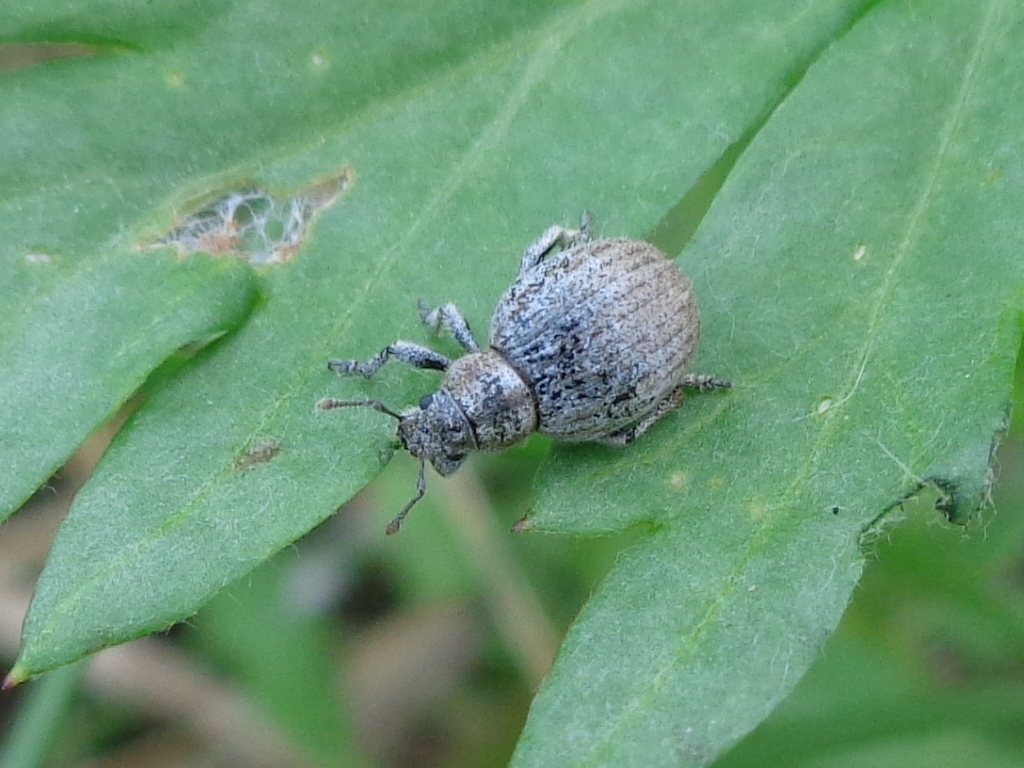

Scientific classification
- Kingdom: Animalia
- Phylum: Arthropoda
- Clade: Pancrustacea
- Class: Insecta
- Order: Coleoptera
- Suborder: Polyphaga
- Infraorder: Cucujiformia
- Superfamily: Curculionoidea
- Family: Curculionidae
- Genus: Philopedon
- Species: P. plagiatum

Binomial name
- Philopedon plagiatum (Schaller, 1783)

= Philopedon plagiatum =

Species of beetle

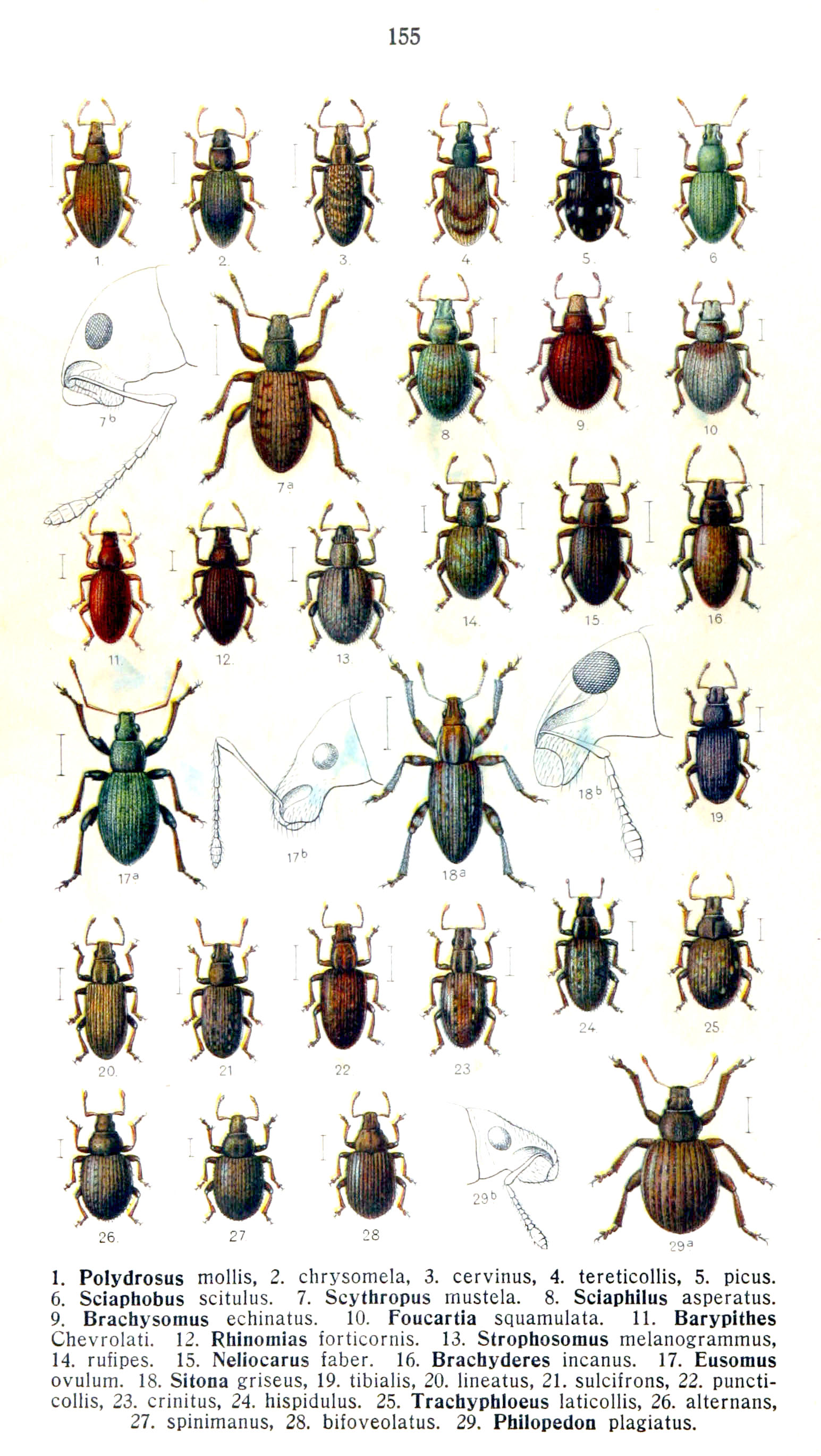
Reitter 1916 plate 155

Philopedon plagiatum (sometimes Philopedon plagiatus), the marram weevil, is a species of broad-nosed weevil in the beetle family Curculionidae. It originates in Western Europe, with a distribution which includes Portugal, Spain, France, Ireland, Great Britain, Belgium, the Netherlands, Germany, Denmark, Norway, Sweden, Finland, Estonia, Latvia, Lithuania, Poland, Czech Republic, Slovakia, Russia, Ukraine, Hungary, Greece, Switzerland and Italy. It has been introduced into North America, first recorded in 1940. It is now established in the Maritime Region of Canada and the northeastern United States.

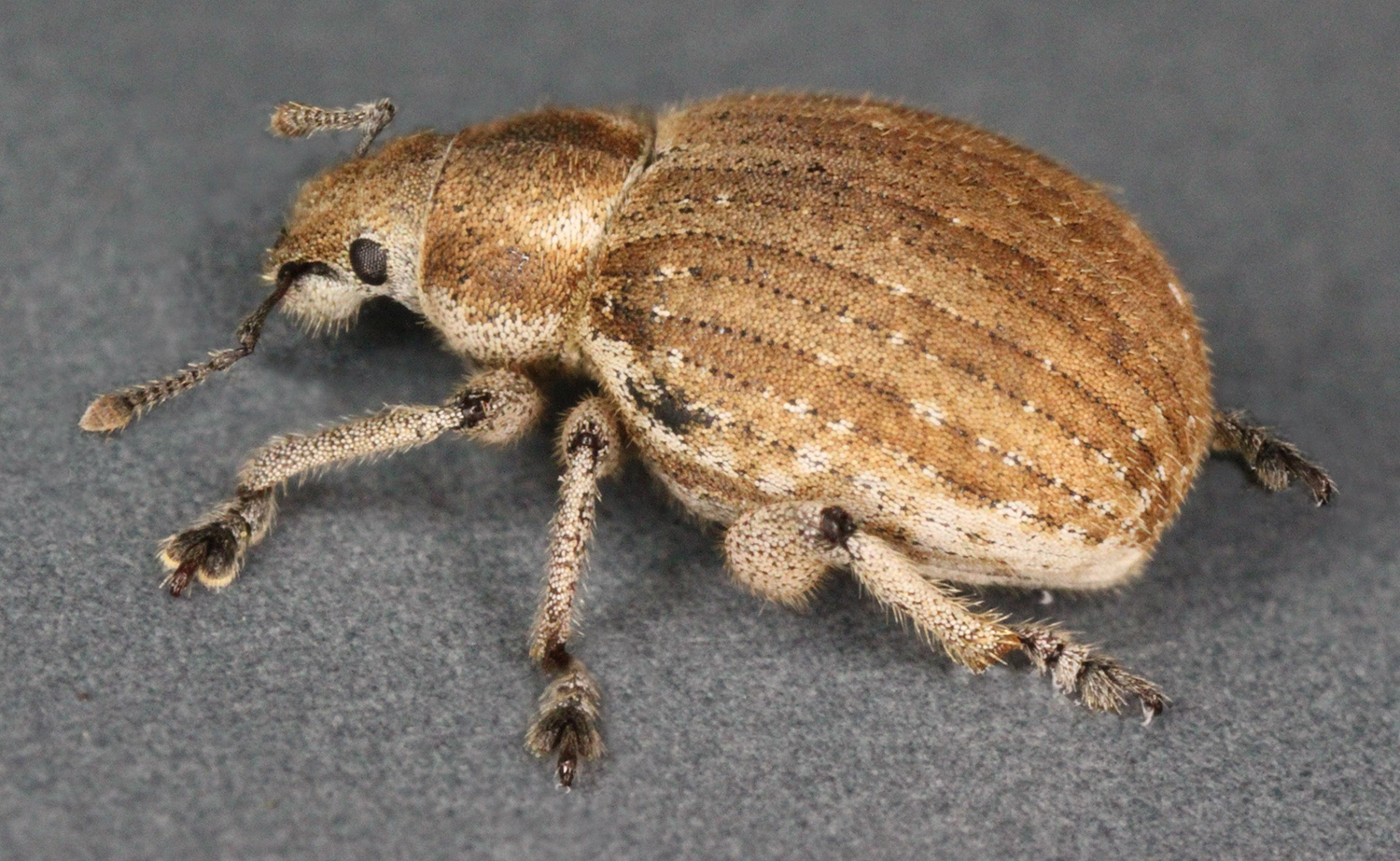
Marram weevil, Philopedon plagiatum

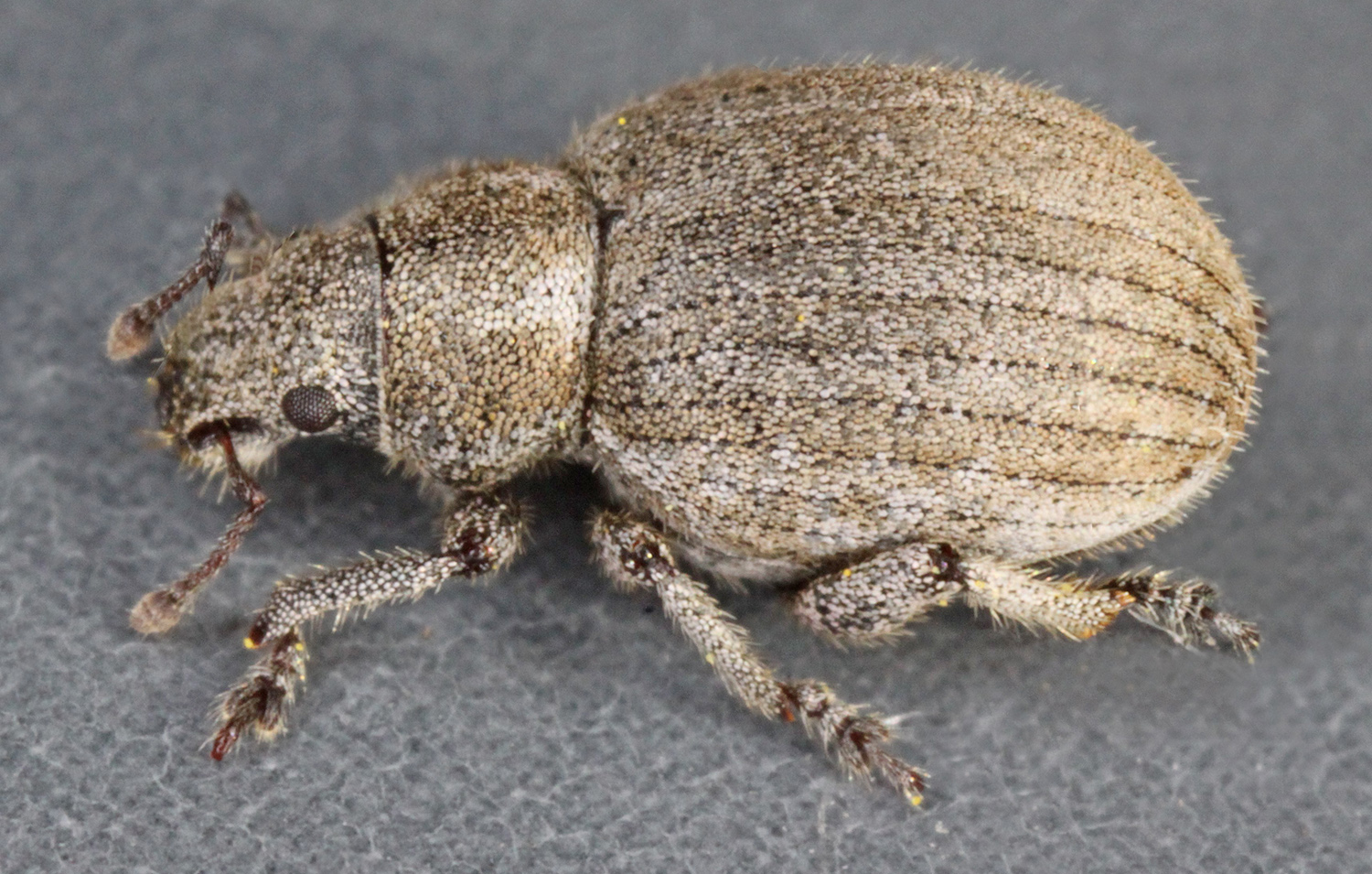
Marram weevil, Philopedon plagiatum
