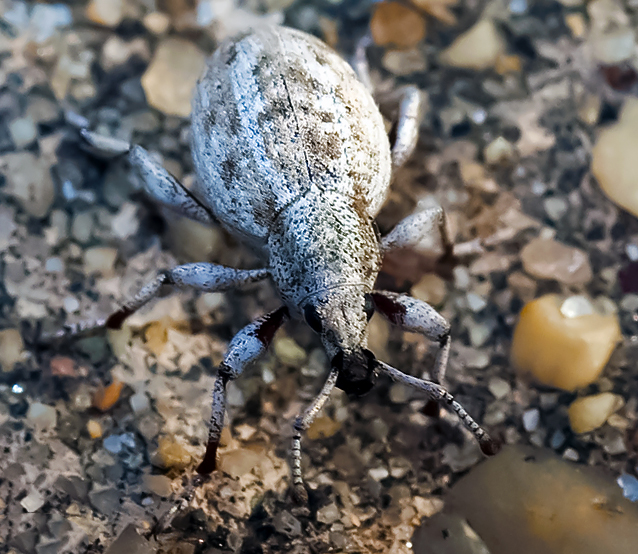
- Agraphus bellicus

Scientific classification
- Domain: Eukaryota
- Kingdom: Animalia
- Phylum: Arthropoda
- Class: Insecta
- Order: Coleoptera
- Suborder: Polyphaga
- Infraorder: Cucujiformia
- Family: Curculionidae
- Subfamily: Entiminae
- Tribe: Agraphini; Horn, 1876

Genera
- See text

= Agraphini =

Tribe of beetles

Agraphini is a weevil tribe in the subfamily Entiminae endemic to the east coast of the United States. There are only two genera known, each with one species.

== Genera ==
- Agraphus
- Paragraphus
