= Dermatodini =

Scientific classification
- Kingdom: Animalia
- Phylum: Arthropoda
- Clade: Pancrustacea
- Class: Insecta
- Order: Coleoptera
- Suborder: Polyphaga
- Infraorder: Cucujiformia
- Superfamily: Curculionoidea
- Family: Curculionidae
- Subfamily: Entiminae
- Tribe: Dermatodini; Emden, 1936

Genera
- See text

Tribe of beetles

Dermatodini is a weevil tribe in the subfamily Entiminae.

== Genera ==
- Antinia
- Burakowskiella
- Conaliophthalmus
- Cratopoxenus
- Decophthalmus
- Dermatodes
- Dermatoxenus
- Dirambon
- Eustalida
- Heterostylus
- Homoeonychus
- Metrioderus
- Mroczkowskiella
- Ochtarthrum
- Phrystanus
- Rhinosomphus
- Saurophthalmus
- Stigmatrachelus (= Stigmatotrachelus, Stigmotrachelus; sometimes in Cneorhinini)
- Zyrcosa
