= Omias =

Scientific classification
- Kingdom: Animalia
- Phylum: Arthropoda
- Class: Insecta
- Order: Coleoptera
- Suborder: Polyphaga
- Infraorder: Cucujiformia
- Family: Curculionidae
- Subfamily: Entiminae
- Tribe: Omiini
- Genus: Omias; Germar, 1817

Genus of beetles

Omias is a genus of broad-nosed weevils in the beetle family Curculionidae. There are more than 50 described species in Omias.

== Species ==
These 56 species belong to the genus Omias:

- Omias alboornatus (Reitter, 1894)
- Omias albus Van Dyke, 1935
- Omias angelovi Borovec, 2015
- Omias armatus (Seidlitz, 1868)
- Omias atticus (Pic, 1902)
- Omias behnei Borovec, 2015
- Omias borysthenicus Korotyaev, 1992
- Omias brancsiki (Reitter, 1906)
- Omias bulgaricus (Purkyne, 1949)
- Omias chelmosensis (Meschnigg, 1939)
- Omias compactus (Angelov, 1973)
- Omias crassirostris Borovec, 2015
- Omias crinitoides (Angelov, 1973)
- Omias cylindrirostris (Angelov, 1973)
- Omias daghestanicus (Iablokov-Khnzorian, 1980)
- Omias erectus Hatch, 1971
- Omias focarilei (Pesarini, 1972)
- Omias formaneki (Reitter, 1906)
- Omias ganglbaueri Formánek, 1908
- Omias globulus (Boheman, 1843)
- Omias glomeratus Schoenherr, 1826
- Omias haematopus Rosenhauer, 1856
- Omias helleri (Reitter, 1906)
- Omias indutus Kiesenwetter, 1864
- Omias inermis (Solari, 1926)
- Omias interruptopunctatus Ménétriés, 1849
- Omias krueperi (Stierlin, 1888)
- Omias macedonicus (Meschnigg, 1939)
- Omias matejkai (Purkyne, 1949)
- Omias microsetosus Białooki, 2015
- Omias minor Hatch, 1971
- Omias moczarski (Angelov, 1973)
- Omias montanus (Angelov, 1973)
- Omias moreanus (Meschnigg, 1939)
- Omias murinus (Boheman, 1843)
- Omias oertzeni Stierlin, 1887
- Omias ossae (Purkyne, 1949)
- Omias pseudomurinus Borovec, 2015
- Omias puberulus Boheman, 1834
- Omias pustulatus (Seidlitz, 1868)
- Omias rilensis Borovec, 2015
- Omias saccatus (LeConte, 1857) (sagebrush weevil)
- Omias sandneri (Reitter, 1906)
- Omias scabripennis Ménétriés, 1849
- Omias scrobithorax Borovec, 2015
- Omias seidlitzi (Kraatz, 1888)
- Omias seminulum (Fabricius, 1792)
- Omias similis (Meschnigg, 1939)
- Omias sparsus Hatch, 1971
- Omias squamulatus Borovec, 1998
- Omias striatus Hatch, 1971
- Omias taygetanos (Purkyne, 1949)
- Omias turcicus (Seidlitz, 1868)
- Omias turkestanicus (Schilsky, 1912)
- Omias verruca Boheman, 1834
- Omias winkelmanni Borovec & Bahr, 2012
