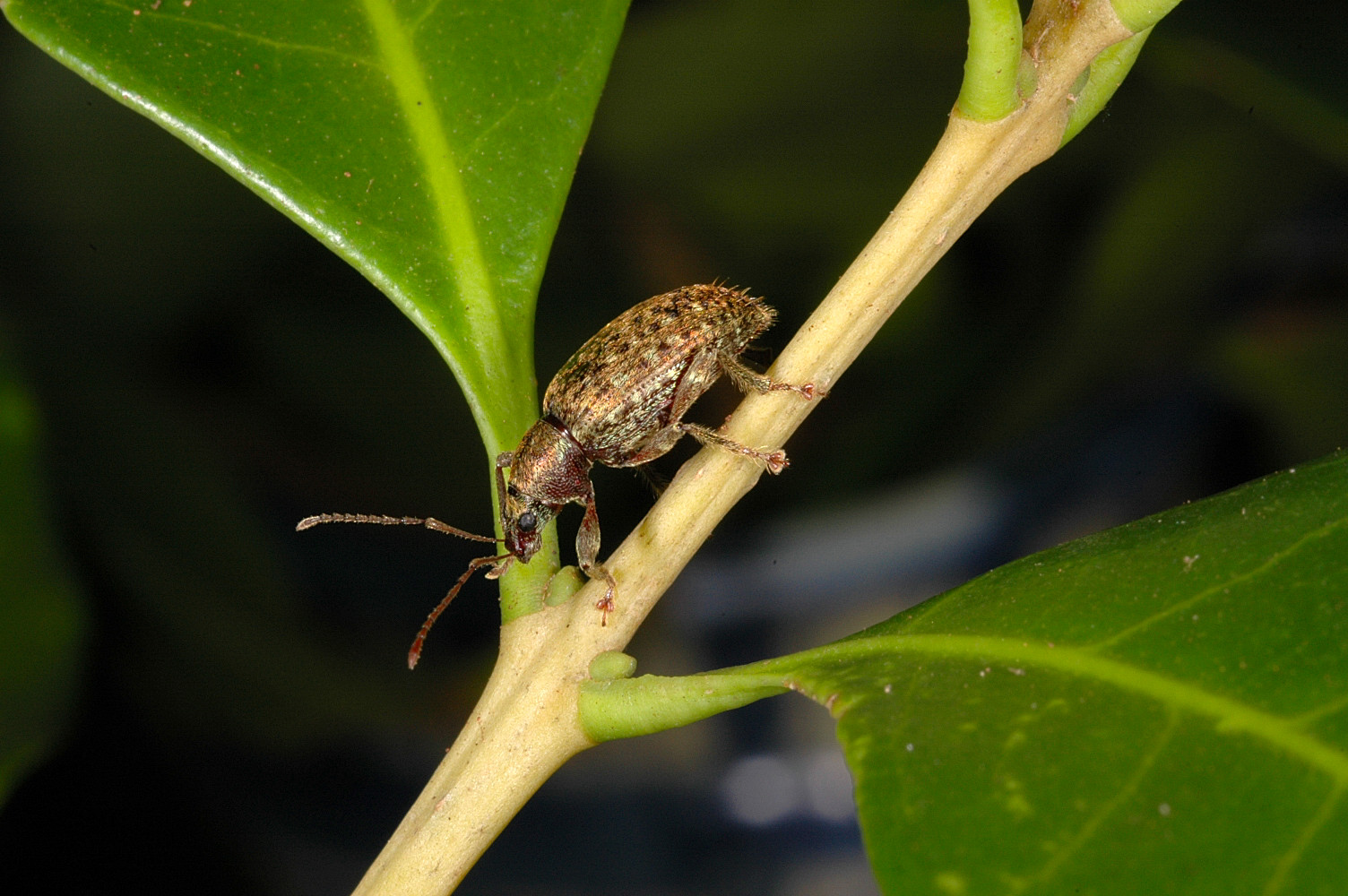
- Laparocerus (Atlantis) lamellipes

Scientific classification
- Domain: Eukaryota
- Kingdom: Animalia
- Phylum: Arthropoda
- Class: Insecta
- Order: Coleoptera
- Suborder: Polyphaga
- Infraorder: Cucujiformia
- Family: Curculionidae
- Subfamily: Entiminae
- Tribe: Laparocerini
- Genus: Laparocerus; Schönherr, 1834

Species
- See text

= Laparocerus =

Genus of weevil

Laparocerus is a genus of weevils of the family Curculionidae with 264 species and subspecies practically exclusive to central Macaronesia: the archipelagos of Madeira, Salvages and the Canaries. The two species present in western Morocco are attributable to a retro-colonisation from the Canary Islands to Africa. Over some nine million years, this lineage of Entiminae has generated some twenty-four monophyletic branches (subgenera) as a result of successive adaptive and geographic radiations, which have been significantly influenced by the geological dynamics of construction and dismantling typical of volcanic islands.

Laparocerus have colonised practically all available habitats: dunes, semi-arid steppes, spurge formations, sclerophyllous forests, evergreen cloud forests, pine forests, high mountain meadows and scrublands, as well as the subterranean environment and volcanic tubes. The morphological diversity correlates with this ample ecological spectrum, with bodies adapted to climbing trees, feeding on shrubs, dwelling in the leaf litter or adapted to subterranean life (some of which are large and blind). Size ranges from 2.2 to 12.7 mm (0.1 to 0.5 in), excluding the rostrum.

Adults are apterous and during the day they remain hidden, mostly buried. They come out at night to eat vegetation and copulate. The notches they leave in the leaves of trees and bushes are characteristic and serve to indicate the presence of these weevils, which are abundant and whose generic name in Spanish is "chascones". The females lay between 100 and 300 eggs (a record 1710 eggs) in clusters that they hide in crevices. Larval development lasts between 4 and 6 months but can continue up to a year if they enter diapause. The larvae are free-living and feed on plant roots. Adults live for 2 to 6 months

Very few species occasionally leave natural habitats and cause damage to vines, peppers or other vegetables that are cultivated in their range. The survival of some very localised species is threatened, but in general and being so prolific, the conservation of most Laparocerus is not of concern.

This genus holds the record for biodiversity in Macaronesia and is an ideal model group for evolutionary studies.

== List of species ==
The following species and subspecies are recognized in this genus, listed by subgenus.

Subgenus Amyntas:

- Laparocerus arrochai Machado, 2009
- Laparocerus bellus Roudier, 1957
- Laparocerus cristatus Machado, 2009
- Laparocerus fernandezi Roudier, 1957
- Laparocerus incomptus (Wollaston, 1865)
- Laparocerus ruteri Roudier, 1957
- Laparocerus subnebulosus (Wollaston, 1864)
- Laparocerus tanausu Machado, 2009
- Laparocerus tetricus (Boheman, 1834)
- Laparocerus tibialis isorae Machado, 2021
- Laparocerus tibialis tibialis (Wollaston, 1864)
- Laparocerus uyttenboogaarti (Zumpt, 1940)

Subgenus Anillobius:

- Laparocerus portosantoi (Franz, 1970)
- Laparocerus rhizophilus Machado, 2021
- Laparocerus solifuga (Fauvel, 1907)

Subgenus Aridotrox:

- Laparocerus chinijo Machado, 2021
- Laparocerus colonnellii Machado, 2011
- Laparocerus dispar Wollaston, 1864
- Laparocerus inexpectatus Machado, 2011
- Laparocerus rasus betancor Machado, 2011
- Laparocerus rasus jandiensis Machado, 2011
- Laparocerus rasus rasus Wollaston, 1864
- Laparocerus susicus montanus Machado, 2011
- Laparocerus susicus susicus (Escalera, 1914)
- Laparocerus xericola Machado, 2011

Subgenus Atlantis:

- Laparocerus calcatrix (Wollaston, 1854)
- Laparocerus clavatus (Wollaston, 1854)
- Laparocerus lamellipes hobbit Machado, 2008
- Laparocerus lamellipes lamellipes (Wollaston, 1854)
- Laparocerus lindbergi Roudier, 1963
- Laparocerus madeirensis Machado, 2008
- Laparocerus noctivagans lauripotens (Wollaston, 1854)
- Laparocerus noctivagans noctivagans (Wollaston, 1854)
- Laparocerus serrado Machado, 2008
- Laparocerus undulatus Wollaston, 1862
- Laparocerus vespertinus (Wollaston, 1854)

Subgenus Atlantodes:

- Laparocerus colasi Roudier, 1958
- Laparocerus erberi Machado, 2021
- Laparocerus inconstans (Wollaston, 1854)
- Laparocerus instabilis (Wollaston, 1854)
- Laparocerus lanatus (Wollaston, 1854)
- Laparocerus mendax (Wollaston, 1854)
- Laparocerus navicularis (Wollaston, 1854)
- Laparocerus prainha Machado, 2008

Subgenus Belicarius

- Laparocerus bentejui bentejui Machado, 2012
- Laparocerus bentejui delicatulus Machado, 2012
- Laparocerus bentejui robustus Machado, 2012
- Laparocerus exiguus Machado, 2007
- Laparocerus exophthalmus cisti Machado, 2021
- Laparocerus exophthalmus exopthalmus Machado, 2007
- Laparocerus feloi Machado, 2009
- Laparocerus longiclava Lindberg, 1953
- Laparocerus magnificus Machado, 2011
- Laparocerus mateui mateui Roudier, 1954
- Laparocerus mateui tuberosus Machado, 2011
- Laparocerus mendicus Wollaston, 1864
- Laparocerus morrisi Machado, 2009
- Laparocerus oculatissimus Machado, 2007
- Laparocerus rotundatus Machado, 2011
- Laparocerus sanchezi arures Machado, 2016
- Laparocerus sanchezi sanchezi Roudier, 1957
- Laparocerus tarsalis Machado, 2009

Subgenus Bencomius:

- Laparocerus bolivari Uyttenboogaart, 1937
- Laparocerus boticarius Machado, 2007
- Laparocerus combrecitensis Roudier, 1957
- Laparocerus crassifrons Wollaston, 1863
- Laparocerus edaphicus Machado, 2008
- Laparocerus escaleraorum Uyttenboogaart, 1937
- Laparocerus gomerensis Lindberg, 1953
- Laparocerus grossepunctatus commixtus Machado, 2021
- Laparocerus grossepunctatus grossepunctatus Wollaston, 1864
- Laparocerus scapularis Wollaston, 1864
- Laparocerus subparallelus Machado, 2007
- Laparocerus supranubius Machado, 2009
- Laparocerus tenuepunctatus oppositus Machado, 2016
- Laparocerus tenuepunctatus tenuepunctatus Roudier, 1957
- Laparocerus undatus Wollaston, 1864

Subgenus Bentaygus:

- Laparocerus brunneus Lindberg, 1953
- Laparocerus propinquus Lindberg, 1953
- Laparocerus vicinus Lindberg, 1953

Subgenus Canariotrox:

- Laparocerus abona Machado, 2016
- Laparocerus acyphus Machado, 2009
- Laparocerus aeneotinctus aeneotinctus Machado, 2009
- Laparocerus aeneotinctus femoralis Machado, 2009
- Laparocerus aguiari Machado, 2007
- Laparocerus crassus Roudier, 1957
- Laparocerus estevezi Machado, 2012
- Laparocerus inaequalis globulipennis Wollaston, 1864
- Laparocerus inaequalis hirtus Wollaston, 1864
- Laparocerus inaequalis inaequalis Wollaston, 1863
- Laparocerus occidentalis Wollaston, 1864
- Laparocerus rugosicollis Uyttenboogaart, 1937
- Laparocerus tauce Machado, 2016
- Laparocerus vestitus Wollaston, 1864

Subgenus Doramasius:

- Laparocerus fraudulentus Machado, 2012
- Laparocerus grayanus (Wollaston, 1865)
- Laparocerus hystricoides Machado, 2012
- Laparocerus inconspectus Roudier, 1957
- Laparocerus semipilosus Machado, 2012

Subgenus Faycanius:

- Laparocerus alluaudi Uyttenboogaart, 1940
- Laparocerus anniversarius Machado, 2012
- Laparocerus arcanus Machado, 2012
- Laparocerus aytamis Machado, 2012
- Laparocerus canutus Machado, 2021
- Laparocerus dissidens dissidens Machado, 2012
- Laparocerus dissidens spolonifer Machado, 2021
- Laparocerus reptans Machado, 2021
- Laparocerus squamosus (Brullé, 1839)
- Laparocerus tasarticus Machado, 2012
- Laparocerus vallei Machado, 2021

Subgenus Fernandezius:

- Laparocerus anagae Machado, 2015
- Laparocerus anisomorphus Machado, 2021
- Laparocerus campestris campestris Machado, 2015
- Laparocerus campestris garafianus Machado, 2021
- Laparocerus hadrocerus Machado, 2021
- Laparocerus impressicollis Wollaston, 1864
- Laparocerus macilentus Machado, 2015
- Laparocerus persimilis Wollaston, 1864
- Laparocerus pitys Machado, 2021
- Laparocerus sculptipennis montivagans Machado, 2013
- Laparocerus sculptipennis sculptipennis Wollaston, 1864
- Laparocerus seriesetosus Wollaston, 1864
- Laparocerus sonchiphagus Machado, 2015
- Laparocerus subcalvus Wollaston, 1864
- Laparocerus subnodosus Wollaston, 1864
- Laparocerus tenicola Machado, 2015
- Laparocerus tesserula Wollaston, 1864

Subgenus Fortunotrox:

- Laparocerus acutipennis Machado, 2007
- Laparocerus benchijigua Machado, 2007
- Laparocerus confusus Machado, 2011
- Laparocerus crotchi Machado, 2016
- Laparocerus decipiens Machado, 2009
- Laparocerus depressus Machado, 2007
- Laparocerus gracilis Wollaston, 1864
- Laparocerus idafe García & Alonso-Zarazaga, 2011
- Laparocerus indutus Wollaston, 1865
- Laparocerus juelensis eremita Machado, 2021
- Laparocerus juelensis juelensis Machado, 2011
- Laparocerus orone aridane Machado, 2009
- Laparocerus orone hierrensis Machado, 2011
- Laparocerus orone orone Machado, 2007
- Laparocerus puncticollis Wollaston, 1864
- Laparocerus scitulus Machado, 2021
- Laparocerus spinimanus Machado, 2007
- Laparocerus subopacus divergens Machado, 2021
- Laparocerus subopacus subopacus Wollaston, 1865

Subgenus Guanchotrox:

- Laparocerus amicorum Machado, 2009
- Laparocerus astralis Machado, 2009
- Laparocerus canariensis Boheman, 1842
- Laparocerus cephalotes Machado, 2011
- Laparocerus debilis Wollaston, 1865
- Laparocerus dissimilis alticola Machado, 2016
- Laparocerus dissimilis dissimilis Lindberg, 1950
- Laparocerus dissimilis infernalis Machado, 2016
- Laparocerus elongatus denudatus Machado, 2021
- Laparocerus elongatus elongatus Machado, 2009
- Laparocerus elongatus mucronatus Machado, 2009
- Laparocerus gerodes Machado, 2016
- Laparocerus humeralis Machado, 2007
- Laparocerus junonius Machado, 2007
- Laparocerus marmoratus Machado, 2012
- Laparocerus obscurus daute Machado, 2016
- Laparocerus obscurus obscurus Wollaston, 1864
- Laparocerus obtriangularis Wollaston, 1864
- Laparocerus ornatus Machado, 2012
- Laparocerus roudieri Machado, 2007
- Laparocerus tafadensis Machado, 2016
- Laparocerus tinguaro tabornoi Machado, 2016
- Laparocerus tinguaro tinguaro Machado, 2007
- Laparocerus tirmensis Machado, 2012

Subgenus Guayre:

- Laparocerus auarita Machado, 2016
- Laparocerus bimbache Machado, 2011
- Laparocerus freyi canescens Machado, 2016
- Laparocerus freyi freyi Uyttenboogaart, 1940
- Laparocerus freyi punctiger Machado, 2016
- Laparocerus freyi vicarius Machado, 2021
- Laparocerus garretai albosquamosus Machado, 2011
- Laparocerus garretai garretai Uyttenboogaart, 1940
- Laparocerus microphthalmus Lindberg, 1950
- Laparocerus obsitus Wollaston, 1864
- Laparocerus osorio Machado, 2012
- Laparocerus rugosivertex Machado, 2012
- Laparocerus tessellatus (Brullé, 1839)
- Laparocerus tirajana Machado, 2012

Subgenus Laparocerus:

- Laparocerus chaoensis cevadae Roudier, 1961
- Laparocerus chaoensis chaoensis Uyttenboogaart, 1940
- Laparocerus cryptus Machado, 2008
- Laparocerus distortus (Wollaston, 1854)
- Laparocerus morio Boheman, 1834

Subgenus Lichenophagus:

- Laparocerus acuminatus (Wollaston, 1854)
- Laparocerus fritillus (Wollaston, 1854)

Subgenus Machadotrox:

- Laparocerus aethiops aethiops Wollaston, 1864
- Laparocerus aethiops garajonay Machado, 2007
- Laparocerus cavernarius Machado, 2011
- Laparocerus chasnensis Machado, 2007
- Laparocerus dacilae García, 1998
- Laparocerus excavatus excavatus Wollaston, 1863
- Laparocerus excavatus prosenemus Machado, 2021
- Laparocerus hupalupa furtivus Machado, 2021
- Laparocerus hupalupa hupalupa Machado, 2007
- Laparocerus hypogeus Machado, 2011
- Laparocerus inermis inermis Machado, 2007
- Laparocerus inermis majonae Machado, 2021
- Laparocerus iruene Machado & García, 2010
- Laparocerus laevis Roudier, 1957
- Laparocerus machadoi García & González, 2006
- Laparocerus oromii Machado, 2008
- Laparocerus sculptus (Brullé, 1839)
- Laparocerus zarazagai criniger Machado, 2021
- Laparocerus zarazagai subreflexus Machado & García, 2010
- Laparocerus zarazagai zarazagai García & Oromí, 1997

Subgenus Mateuius:

- Laparocerus amplificatus (Wollaston, 1865)
- Laparocerus auctus Wollaston, 1864
- Laparocerus buccatrix (Wollaston, 1865)
- Laparocerus dilutus Machado, 2015
- Laparocerus merigensis Machado, 2015
- Laparocerus notatus Machado, 2015
- Laparocerus quadratus Machado, 2015
- Laparocerus teselinde Machado, 2015

Subgenus Nanotrox:

- Laparocerus buenavistae Roudier, 1957
- Laparocerus palmensis Lindberg, 1953
- Laparocerus seminitens Lindberg, 1950
- Laparocerus tenellus Wollaston, 1864
- Laparocerus transversus Lindberg, 1950

Subgenus Pecoudius:

- Laparocerus compactus Wollaston, 1864
- Laparocerus eliasenae (Uyttenboogaart, 1929)
- Laparocerus franzi Machado, 2012
- Laparocerus sulcirostris Wollaston, 1864
- Laparocerus teldensis Machado, 2012

Subgenus Proteotrox:

- Laparocerus crassirostris Wollaston, 1864
- Laparocerus federico Machado, 2018
- Laparocerus lepidopterus lepidopterus Wollaston, 1864
- Laparocerus lepidopterus pecoudi Roudier, 1957
- Laparocerus lopezi Machado, 2008
- Laparocerus moyanus Machado, 2021
- Laparocerus mulagua Machado, 2007
- Laparocerus separandus Lindberg, 1953
- Laparocerus soniae Machado, 2016

Subgenus Pseudatlantis:

- Laparocerus abditus Roudier, 1963
- Laparocerus excelsus (Wollaston. 1854)
- Laparocerus schaumii forae (Wollaston, 1854)
- Laparocerus schaumii schaumii (Wollaston, 1854)
- Laparocerus silvaticus Machado, 2008
- Laparocerus stuebeni Machado, 2008

Subgenus Purpuranius:

- Laparocerus calvus Machado, 2011
- Laparocerus curvipes curvipes Lindberg, 1950
- Laparocerus curvipes espanoli Roudier, 1954
- Laparocerus curvipes famarae Machado, 2011
- Laparocerus fraterculus Machado, 2011
- Laparocerus longipennis Machado, 2011
- Laparocerus maxorata Machado, 2011

Subgenus Wollastonius:

- Laparocerus aenescens (Wollaston, 1854)
- Laparocerus angustulus (Wollaston, 1857)
- Laparocerus desertarum Machado, 2021
- Laparocerus ventrosus (Wollaston, 1854)
- Laparocerus waterhousei (Wollaston, 1854)

incertae sedis:

- Laparocerus bacalladoi Machado, 2005
- Laparocerus depilis Roudier, 1957
- Laparocerus ellipticus Wollaston, 1863
- Laparocerus heres heres Machado, 2007
- Laparocerus heres jocoensis Machado, 2007
- Laparocerus inflatus Wollaston, 1865
- Laparocerus pilosiventris Machado, 2011
- Laparocerus sanctaecrucis Machado, 2016
