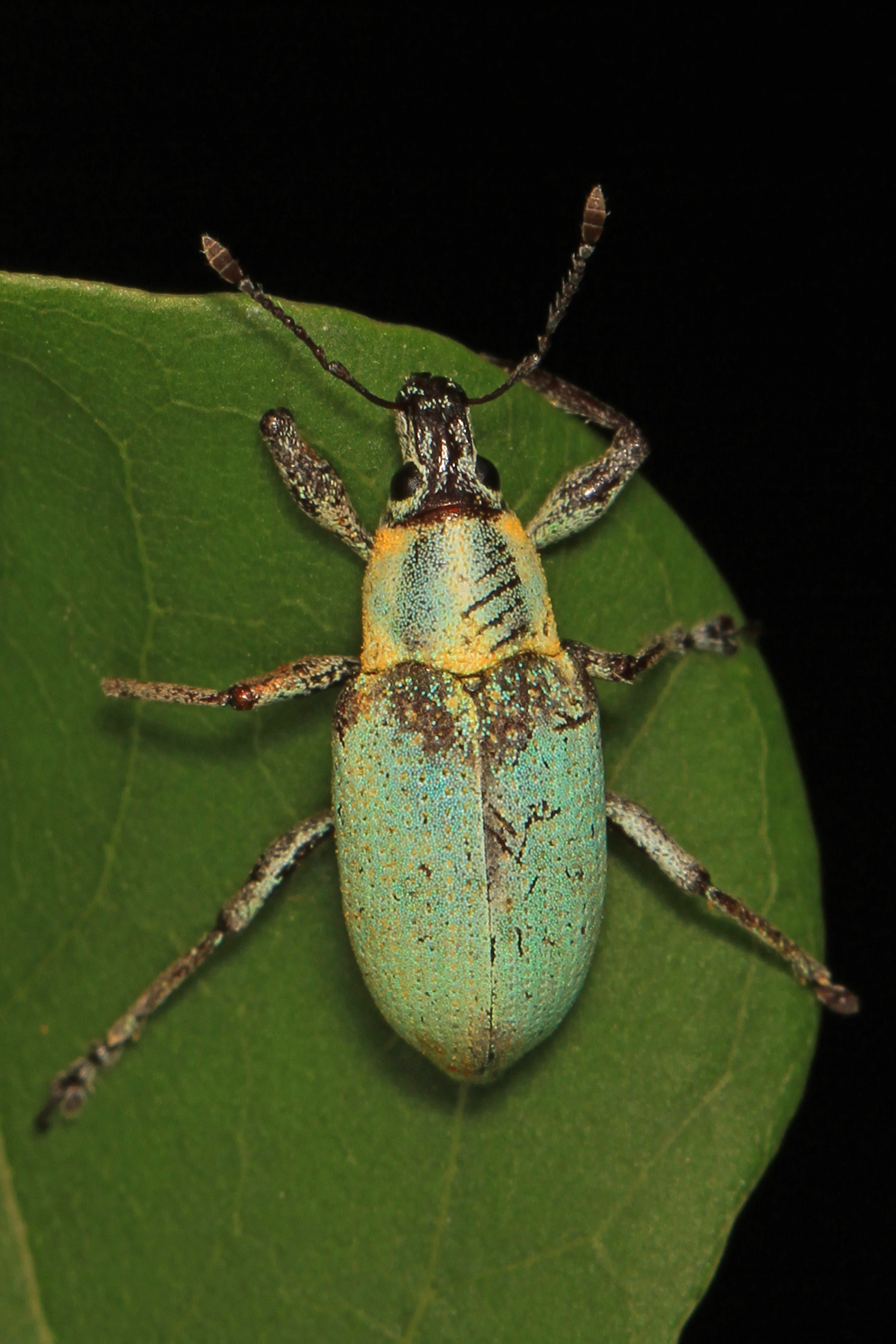

Scientific classification
- Domain: Eukaryota
- Kingdom: Animalia
- Phylum: Arthropoda
- Class: Insecta
- Order: Coleoptera
- Suborder: Polyphaga
- Infraorder: Cucujiformia
- Family: Curculionidae
- Genus: Pachnaeus
- Species: P. litus

Binomial name
- Pachnaeus litus (Germar, 1824)

= Pachnaeus litus =

Species of beetle

Pachnaeus litus, known generally as the blue-green citrus root weevil or blue-green citrus weevil, is a species of broad-nosed weevil in the beetle family Curculionidae. It is found in North America.

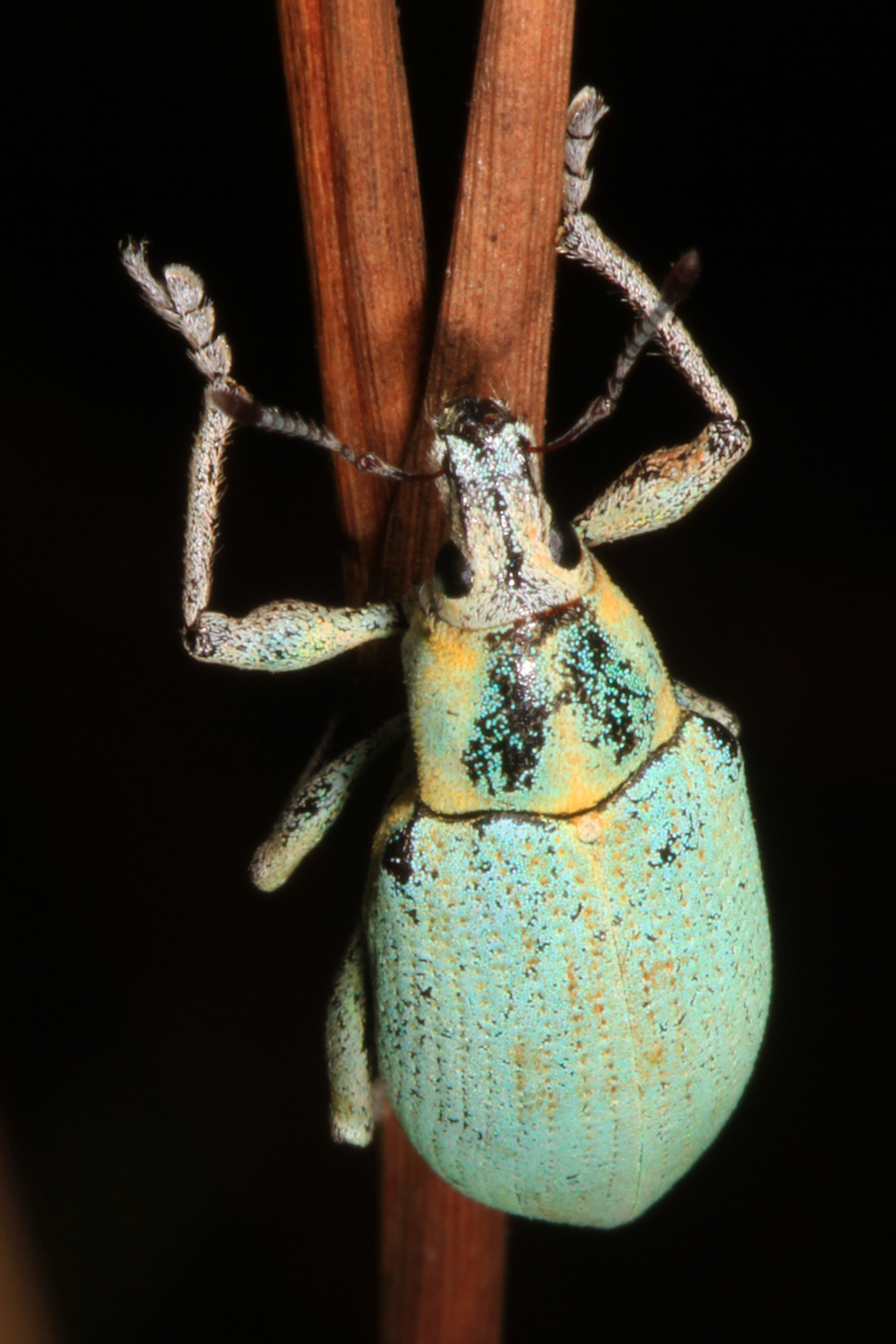
Blue-green citrus root weevil, Pachnaeus litus
