= Sapotes =

Scientific classification
- Kingdom: Animalia
- Phylum: Arthropoda
- Class: Insecta
- Order: Coleoptera
- Suborder: Polyphaga
- Infraorder: Cucujiformia
- Family: Curculionidae
- Subfamily: Entiminae
- Tribe: Ophryastini
- Genus: Sapotes; Casey, 1888

Genus of beetles

Sapotes is a genus of broad-nosed weevils in the beetle family Curculionidae. There are about five described species in Sapotes.

== Species ==
These five species belong to the genus Sapotes:

- Sapotes caseyi Jones & O?Brien, 2007^{c g}
- Sapotes longipilis Van Dyke, 1934^{i c g b}
- Sapotes puncticollis Casey, 1888^{i c g}
- Sapotes setosus Jones & O?Brien, 2007^{c g}
- Sapotes sordidus Jones & O?Brien, 2007^{c g}

Data sources: i = ITIS, c = Catalogue of Life, g = GBIF, b = Bugguide.net
