= Rhyncogonus =

Scientific classification
- Domain: Eukaryota
- Kingdom: Animalia
- Phylum: Arthropoda
- Class: Insecta
- Order: Coleoptera
- Suborder: Polyphaga
- Infraorder: Cucujiformia
- Family: Curculionidae
- Subfamily: Entiminae
- Tribe: Rhyncogonini
- Genus: Rhyncogonus; Sharp, 1885

Species
- See text.

Genus of beetles

Rhyncogonus is a genus of beetle in the family Curculionidae. The genus is endemic to islands in the Pacific Ocean.

== Species ==
There are currently 66 described species in the genus Rhyncogonus (incomplete list):

- Rhyncogonus albipilis Van Dyke, 1937
- Rhyncogonus angustus Van Dyke, 1937
- Rhyncogonus biformis Perkins, 1926
- Rhyncogonus blackburni Sharp, 1885
- †Rhyncogonus bryani Perkins, 1919
- Rhyncogonus caudatus Van Dyke, 1937
- Rhyncogonus cordiformis Van Dyke, 1937
- Rhyncogonus corvinus Van Dyke, 1937
- Rhyncogonus debilis Van Dyke, 1937
- Rhyncogonus depressus Perkins, 1900
- Rhyncogonus dubius Perkins, 1900
- Rhyncogonus duhameli Ramage, 2021
- Rhyncogonus erebus Van Dyke, 1937
- Rhyncogonus excavatus Van Dyke, 1937
- Rhyncogonus expansus Van Dyke, 1937
- Rhyncogonus exsul Perkins, 1926
- Rhyncogonus extraneus Perkins, 1910
- Rhyncogonus fosbergi Van Dyke, 1937
- Rhyncogonus freycinetiae Perkins, 1910
- Rhyncogonus funereus Perkins, 1900
- Rhyncogonus fuscus Perkins, 1900
- Rhyncogonus fulvus Van Dyke, 1937
- Rhyncogonus giffardi Sharp, 1919
- Rhyncogonus glabrus Van Dyke, 1937
- Rhyncogonus gracilis Van Dyke, 1937
- Rhyncogonus hendersoni Van Dyke, 1937
- Rhyncogonus hispidus Van Dyke, 1937
- Rhyncogonus interstitialis Van Dyke, 1937
- Rhyncogonus lineatus Van Dyke, 1937
- Rhyncogonus longulus Van Dyke 1937
- Rhyncogonus nigerrimus Van Dyke 1937
- Rhyncogonus nigroaeneus Van Dyke 1937
- Rhyncogonus nodosus Van Dyke, 1937
- Rhyncogonus obscurus Van Dyke, 1937
- Rhyncogonus opacipennis Van Dyke, 1937
- Rhyncogonus othello Van Dyke, 1937
- Rhyncogonus pectoralis Van Dyke, 1937
- Rhyncogonus pleuralis Van Dyke, 19377
- Rhyncogonus pubipennis Van Dyke, 1937
- Rhyncogonus pulvereus Van Dyke, 1937
- Rhyncogonus regularis Van Dyke, 1937
- Rhyncogonus rufulus Van Dyke, 1937
- Rhyncogonus sparsus Van Dyke, 1937
- Rhyncogonus submetallicus Van Dyke, 1935
- Rhyncogonus tenebrosus Van Dyke, 1937
- Rhyncogonus testudineus Van Dyke, 1937
- Rhyncogonus tuberosus Van Dyke, 1937
- Rhyncogonus vagus Van Dyke, 1937
- Rhyncogonus variabilis Van Dyke, 1937
- Rhyncogonus ventralis Van Dyke, 1937
- Rhyncogonus viridescens Van Dyke, 1937
- Rhyncogonus zimmermani Van Dyke, 1937
