= Pachnaeus opalus =

Scientific classification
- Domain: Eukaryota
- Kingdom: Animalia
- Phylum: Arthropoda
- Class: Insecta
- Order: Coleoptera
- Suborder: Polyphaga
- Infraorder: Cucujiformia
- Family: Curculionidae
- Genus: Pachnaeus
- Species: P. opalus

Binomial name
- Pachnaeus opalus (Olivier, 1807)

Synonyms
- Pachnaeus distans Horn, 1876

Species of beetle

Pachnaeus opalus, the northern citrus root weevil, is a species of broad-nosed weevil in the family Curculionidae. It is found in North America.
