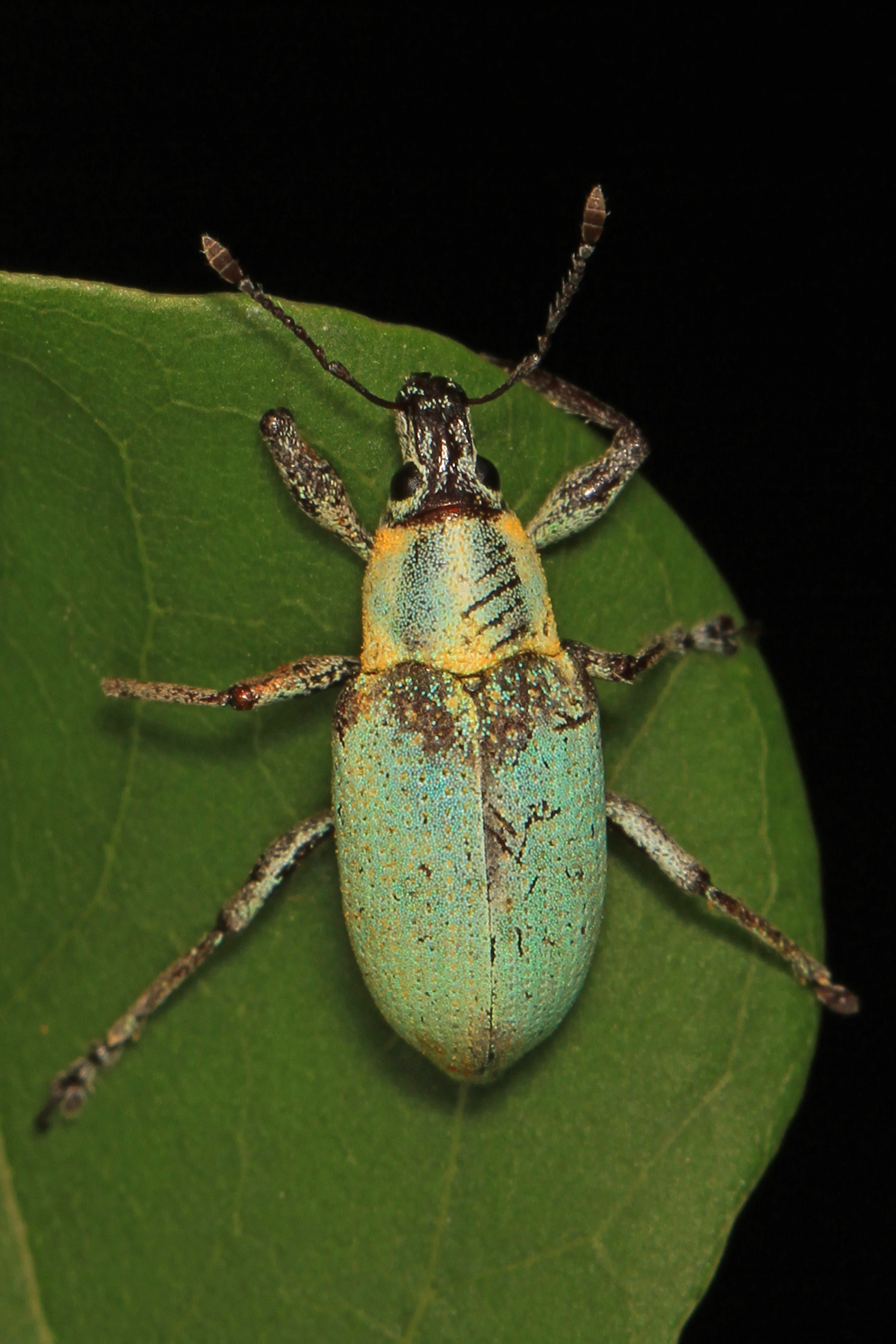
- Pachnaeus litus

Scientific classification
- Domain: Eukaryota
- Kingdom: Animalia
- Phylum: Arthropoda
- Class: Insecta
- Order: Coleoptera
- Suborder: Polyphaga
- Infraorder: Cucujiformia
- Family: Curculionidae
- Genus: Pachnaeus; Schönherr, 1826

= Pachnaeus =

Genus of beetles

Pachnaeus is a genus of broad-nosed weevils in the family Curculionidae. There are about seven described species in Pachnaeus.

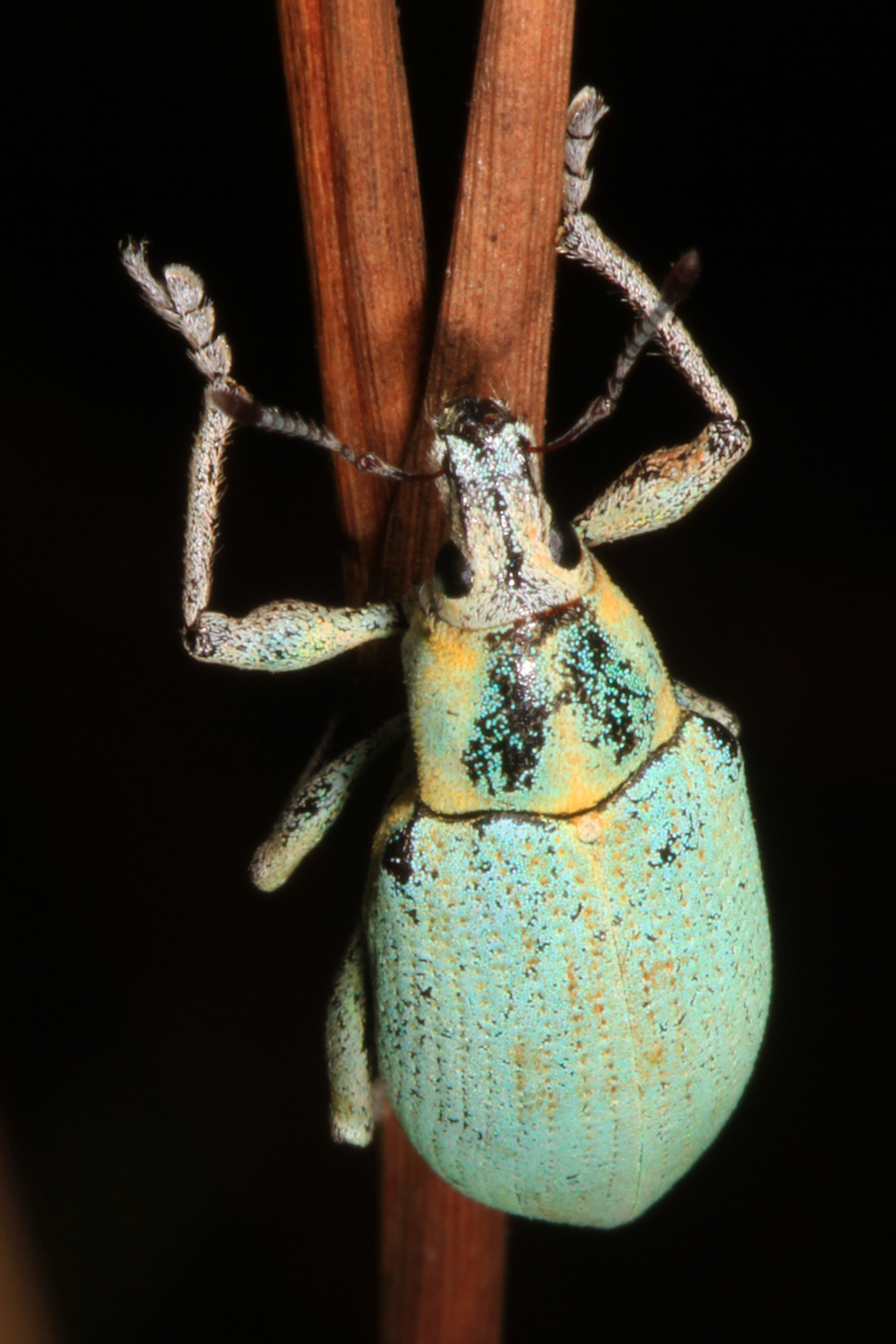
Pachnaeus litus

== Species ==
These seven species belong to the genus Pachnaeus:

- Pachnaeus azurescens Gyllenhal, 1834
- Pachnaeus citri Marshall, 1916
- Pachnaeus costatus Perroud, 1853
- Pachnaeus litus (Germar, 1824) (blue-green citrus root weevil)
- Pachnaeus marmoratus Marshall, 1916
- Pachnaeus opalus (Olivier, 1807) (northern citrus root weevil)
- Pachnaeus psittacus (Olivier, 1807)
