= Brachytrachelus =

Scientific classification
- Kingdom: Animalia
- Phylum: Arthropoda
- Clade: Pancrustacea
- Class: Insecta
- Order: Coleoptera
- Suborder: Polyphaga
- Infraorder: Cucujiformia
- Superfamily: Curculionoidea
- Family: Curculionidae
- Subfamily: Entiminae
- Tribe: Tanyrhynchini
- Genus: Brachytrachelus; Schoenherr, 1847

Species
- See text

Genus of beetles

Brachytrachelus is a weevil genus in the tribe Tanyrhynchini.

== Species ==
- Brachytrachelus opatrinus Lacordaire, T., 1863
- Brachytrachelus opatrinus Schoenherr, 1848
- Brachytrachelus porosus Fåhraeus, O.I., 1871
