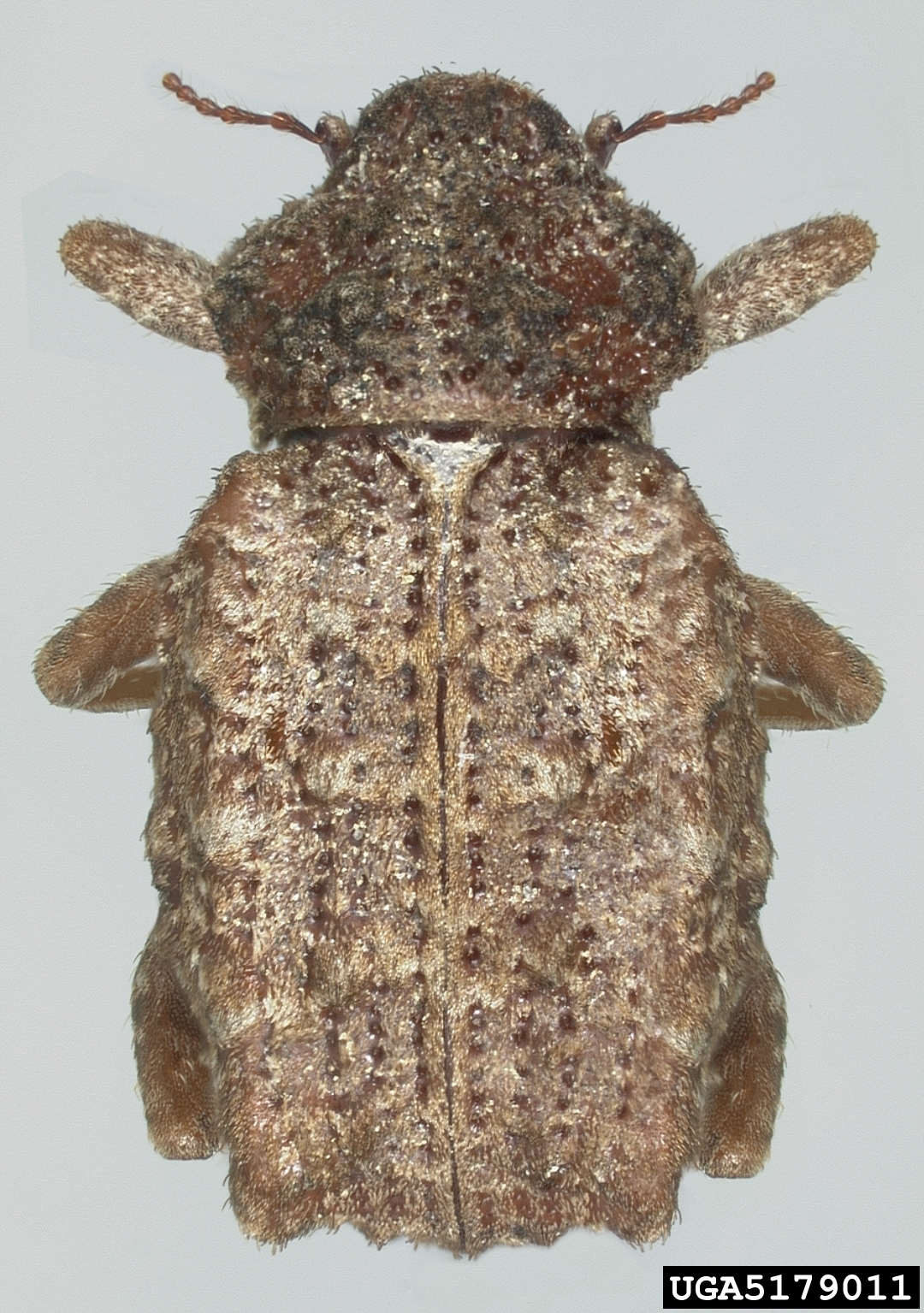
- Premnotrypes vorax

Scientific classification
- Kingdom: Animalia
- Phylum: Arthropoda
- Clade: Pancrustacea
- Class: Insecta
- Order: Coleoptera
- Suborder: Polyphaga
- Infraorder: Cucujiformia
- Superfamily: Curculionoidea
- Family: Curculionidae
- Subfamily: Entiminae
- Tribe: Premnotrypini
- Genus: Premnotrypes; Pierce 1914

= Premnotrypes =

Genus of beetles

Premnotrypes (Andean potato weevil) is a genus of weevils (a type of beetles). It was described in 1914 by American entomologist W. Dwight Pierce (1881-1967). Several species in the genus are pests, because the larvae feed on potato tubers and the adults on the leaves (one species even has the specific epithet solanivorax, 'potato devourer'). It is native to Latin America, in particular Bolivia, Colombia, Ecuador and Peru, but has been recorded as a possible invader on other continents. Some species also feed on tubers of other cultivated plants, like Oca. Premnotrypes includes the following species:

- Premnotrypes clivosus (Kuschel 1956)
- Premnotrypes fractirostris (Marshall 1936)
- Premnotrypes latithorax (Pierce 1914)
- Premnotrypes piercei (Alcalá 1979)
- Premnotrypes pusillus (Kuschel 1956)
- Premnotrypes sanfordi (Pierce 1918)
- Premnotrypes solani (Pierce 1914) (type species)
- Premnotrypes solaniperda (Kuschel 1956)
- Premnotrypes solanivorax (Heller 1935)
- Premnotrypes suturicallus (Kuschel 1956)
- Premnotrypes vorax (Hustache 1933)
- Premnotrypes zischkai (Kuschel 1956)
