= Omias saccatus =

Scientific classification
- Domain: Eukaryota
- Kingdom: Animalia
- Phylum: Arthropoda
- Class: Insecta
- Order: Coleoptera
- Suborder: Polyphaga
- Infraorder: Cucujiformia
- Family: Curculionidae
- Genus: Omias
- Species: O. saccatus

Binomial name
- Omias saccatus (LeConte, 1857)

Species of beetle

Omias saccatus, the sagebrush weevil, is a species of broad-nosed weevil in the beetle family Curculionidae. It is found in North America.
