= Dermatoxenus =

Scientific classification
- Kingdom: Animalia
- Phylum: Arthropoda
- Class: Insecta
- Order: Coleoptera
- Suborder: Polyphaga
- Infraorder: Cucujiformia
- Family: Curculionidae
- Subfamily: Entiminae
- Tribe: Cneorhinini
- Genus: Dermatoxenus; Marshall, 1916

Type species
- Dermatodes vermiculatus Gyllenhal, 1833

Genus of broad-nosed weevils

Dermatoxenus is a genus of broad-nosed weevils in the family Curculionidae. They are found in India, Myanmar, Indonesia, Japan, and Taiwan.

== Description ==
The body length of Dermatoxenus ranges from 8.0 to 13.0 mm. The head is transversely impressed behind the eyes, and the frons bears a median furrow between the eyes. The eyes are small, rounded, and prominent. The rostrum has a crosswise groove at the base, just in front of the eyes, and a deep central furrow with one or two shallower grooves on each side. The epistome is large and bare. The scrobe (or specialized antennal groove) is short and bends sharply downward, ending some distance before the front edge of the eye.

The antenna have a short basal segment that does not reach the anterior margin of the eye. The first two segments of the funicle are longer than the ones that follow. The mandibles have a very small scar, and the deciduous process is stalked.

The pronotum is approximately as long as it is wide, widest at or near the base, and sometimes has a shallow middle groove. The rear margin is slightly extended at the center. The small scutellar shield is not visible from above. The elytra are broader at the base than the pronotum and appear swollen toward the back when viewed from the side. The shoulders are distinct. The elytral intervals may be slightly raised or tuberculate, and there are ten complete rows of punctures (striae), which may be either clear or faint.

The legs have clavate femora without ventral teeth. The metatibia is straight, with a small, rounded inner apical spur that is largely concealed by setae or scales. The corbel bevel is broad, closed, and densely scaled. The third tarsal article is large, deeply bilobed, and densely pilose ventrally; the claws are connate.

The aedeagus is slender, with very long aedeagal apodemes about twice the length of the aedeagal body. The endophallus contains a very long, semi-rigid, rod-like flagellum that exceeds the length of the apodemes, based on three species examined.

== Taxonomy ==
Dermatoxenus contains the following species:

- Dermatoxenus binodosus (Marshall, 1916)
- Dermatoxenus caesicollis (Gyllenhal, 1833)
- Dermatoxenus candidus (Heller, 1896)
- Dermatoxenus chrysochlorus (Ritsema, 1882)
- Dermatoxenus clathratus (Roelofs, 1873)
- Dermatoxenus helleri (Marshall, 1916)
- Dermatoxenus hians (Marshall, 1932)
- Dermatoxenus indicus (Marshall, 1916)
- Dermatoxenus lithocollus (Heller, 1915)
- Dermatoxenus marmoreus (Marshall, 1941)
- Dermatoxenus montanus (Morimoto, 2015)
- Dermatoxenus quadrisignatus (Marshall, 1916)
- Dermatoxenus ritsemai (Heller, 1915)
- Dermatoxenus scutellatus (Heller, 1915)
- Dermatoxenus sexnodosus (Voss, 1932)
- Dermatoxenus vermiculatus (Gyllenhal, 1833)
