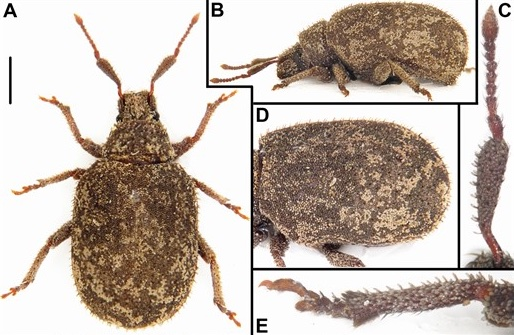
- Cervellaea coheni. A, body, dorsal view. B, body, lateral view. C, antenna. D, elytra, dorso-lateral view. E, protibia.

Scientific classification
- Kingdom: Animalia
- Phylum: Arthropoda
- Clade: Pancrustacea
- Class: Insecta
- Order: Coleoptera
- Suborder: Polyphaga
- Infraorder: Cucujiformia
- Superfamily: Curculionoidea
- Family: Curculionidae
- Subfamily: Entiminae
- Tribe: Namaini; Borovec & Meregalli, 2021

Genera
- See text

= Namaini =

Tribe of beetles

Namaini is a tribe of soil-associated weevils from South Africa in the subfamily Entiminae.

== Genera ==
The following genera are recognized:

1. Cervellaea Borovec & Meregalli, 2021
2. Nama Borovec & Meregalli, 2013
3. Namaquania Borovec & Meregalli, 2021
4. Pentamerica Borovec & Meregalli, 2021
5. Springbokia Borovec & Meregalli, 2021
6. Yamalaka Borovec & Meregalli, 2021
7. Richtersveldiella Borovec & Meregalli, 2026
