= Omiini =

Scientific classification
- Kingdom: Animalia
- Phylum: Arthropoda
- Clade: Pancrustacea
- Class: Insecta
- Order: Coleoptera
- Suborder: Polyphaga
- Infraorder: Cucujiformia
- Superfamily: Curculionoidea
- Family: Curculionidae
- Subfamily: Entiminae
- Tribe: Omiini; Shuckard, 1840

Genera
- See text

Tribe of beetles

Omiini is a weevil tribe in the subfamily Entiminae.

== Genera ==
Asphalmus – Baromiamima – Bryodaemon – Chaerocephalus – Desbrochersella – Elytrodon – Gyratogaster – Hlavena – Humeromima – Leianisorhynchus – Microelytrodon – Omiamima – Omias – Rhinomias – Scoliolenus – Teripelus – Urometopus – Yunakovius
