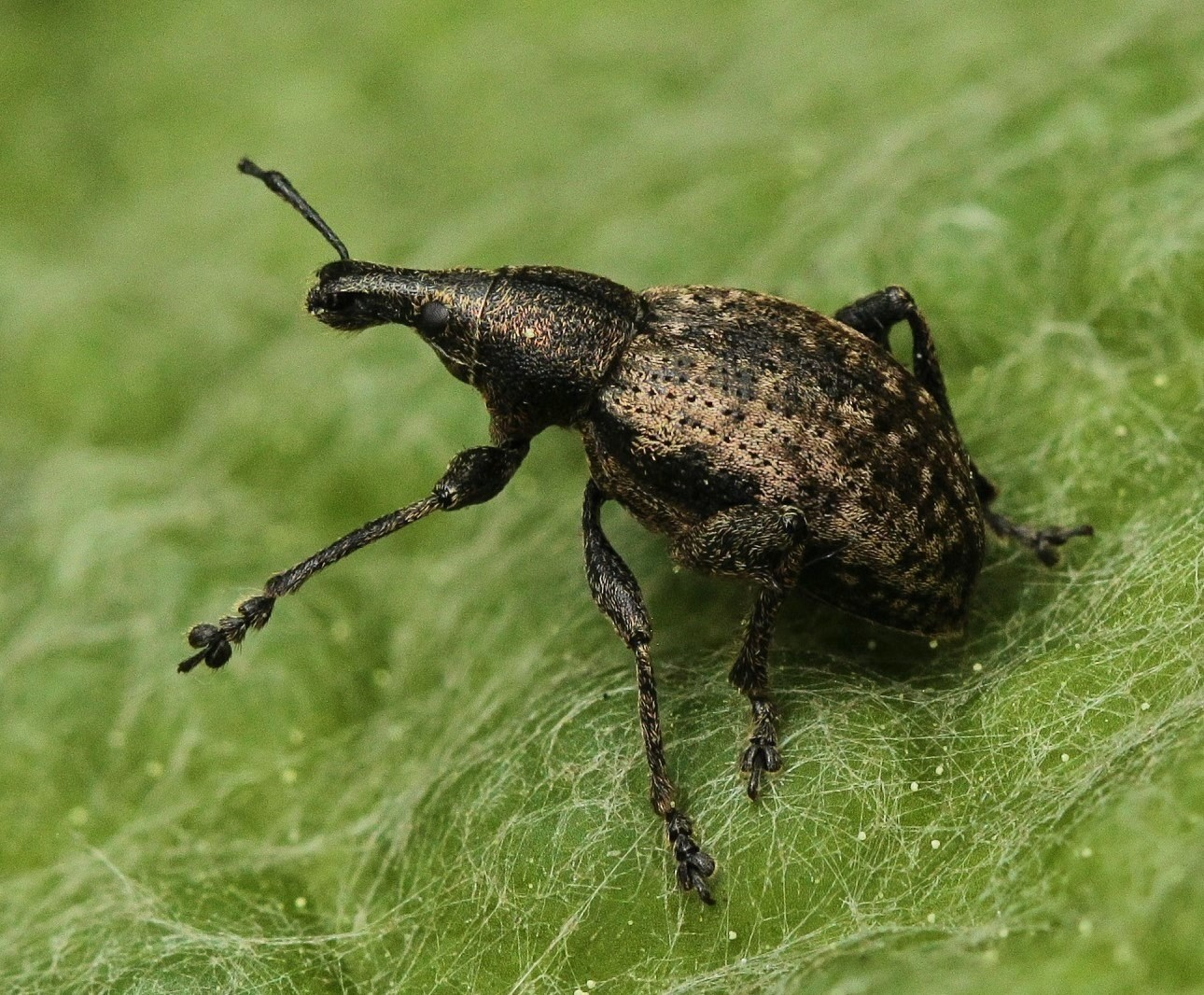
- Nastus fausti, Russia

Scientific classification
- Kingdom: Animalia
- Phylum: Arthropoda
- Class: Insecta
- Order: Coleoptera
- Suborder: Polyphaga
- Infraorder: Cucujiformia
- Family: Curculionidae
- Genus: Nastus
- Species: N. fausti

Binomial name
- Nastus fausti Reitter, 1888

= Nastus fausti =

Species of beetle

Nastus fausti is a weevil that has been investigated as a potential biocontrol agent for giant hogweeds (Heracleum mantegazzianum Sommier et Levier, Heracleum sosnowskyi Manden, and Heracleum persicum Desf. ex Fischer.) in Europe.

During experimentation the weevils were found to not be specific against the target species and could not be recommended as a biocontrol agent.

== Subspecies ==
These two subspecies belong to the species Nastus fausti:

- Nastus fausti fausti Reitter, 1888
- Nastus fausti tayae Arzanov & Davidian, 1995
