= Leptostethini =

Scientific classification
- Kingdom: Animalia
- Phylum: Arthropoda
- Class: Insecta
- Order: Coleoptera
- Suborder: Polyphaga
- Infraorder: Cucujiformia
- Family: Curculionidae
- Subfamily: Entiminae
- Tribe: Leptostethini; Lacordaire, 1863

Genera
- Leplostethus

Tribe of beetles

Leptostethini is a weevil tribe in the subfamily Entiminae.
