= Cylydrorhinini =

Scientific classification
- Kingdom: Animalia
- Phylum: Arthropoda
- Class: Insecta
- Order: Coleoptera
- Suborder: Polyphaga
- Infraorder: Cucujiformia
- Family: Curculionidae
- Subfamily: Entiminae
- Tribe: Cylydrorhinini; Lacordaire, 1863

Genera
- See text

Tribe of beetles

Cylydrorhinini is a weevil tribe in the subfamily Entiminae.

== Genera ==
Caneorhinus – Cylydrorhinus – Gastrocis – Geosomus – Machaerophrys – Telurus – †Dorotheus
