= Pristorhynchini =

Scientific classification
- Kingdom: Animalia
- Phylum: Arthropoda
- Class: Insecta
- Order: Coleoptera
- Suborder: Polyphaga
- Infraorder: Cucujiformia
- Family: Curculionidae
- Subfamily: Entiminae
- Tribe: Pristorhynchini; Heer, 1847

Genera
- Pristorhynchus

Tribe of beetles

Pristorhynchini is a weevil tribe in the subfamily Entiminae.
