= Polycatini =

Scientific classification
- Domain: Eukaryota
- Kingdom: Animalia
- Phylum: Arthropoda
- Class: Insecta
- Order: Coleoptera
- Suborder: Polyphaga
- Infraorder: Cucujiformia
- Family: Curculionidae
- Subfamily: Entiminae
- Tribe: Polycatini; Marshall, 1956

Genera
- Evrostopolycatus; Polycatus

Tribe of beetles

Polycatini is a weevil tribe in the subfamily Entiminae.
