= Cratopodini =

Scientific classification
- Kingdom: Animalia
- Phylum: Arthropoda
- Clade: Pancrustacea
- Class: Insecta
- Order: Coleoptera
- Suborder: Polyphaga
- Infraorder: Cucujiformia
- Superfamily: Curculionoidea
- Family: Curculionidae
- Subfamily: Entiminae
- Tribe: Cratopodini; Hustache, 1919

Genera
- See text

Tribe of beetles

Cratopodini is a weevil tribe in the subfamily Entiminae.

== Genera ==
- Cratopophilus
- Cratopopsis
- Cratopus
- Hemicratopus
- Lujaiella
- Pseudiphisus
- Scaevinus
- Stiamus
- Zyrcosoides
