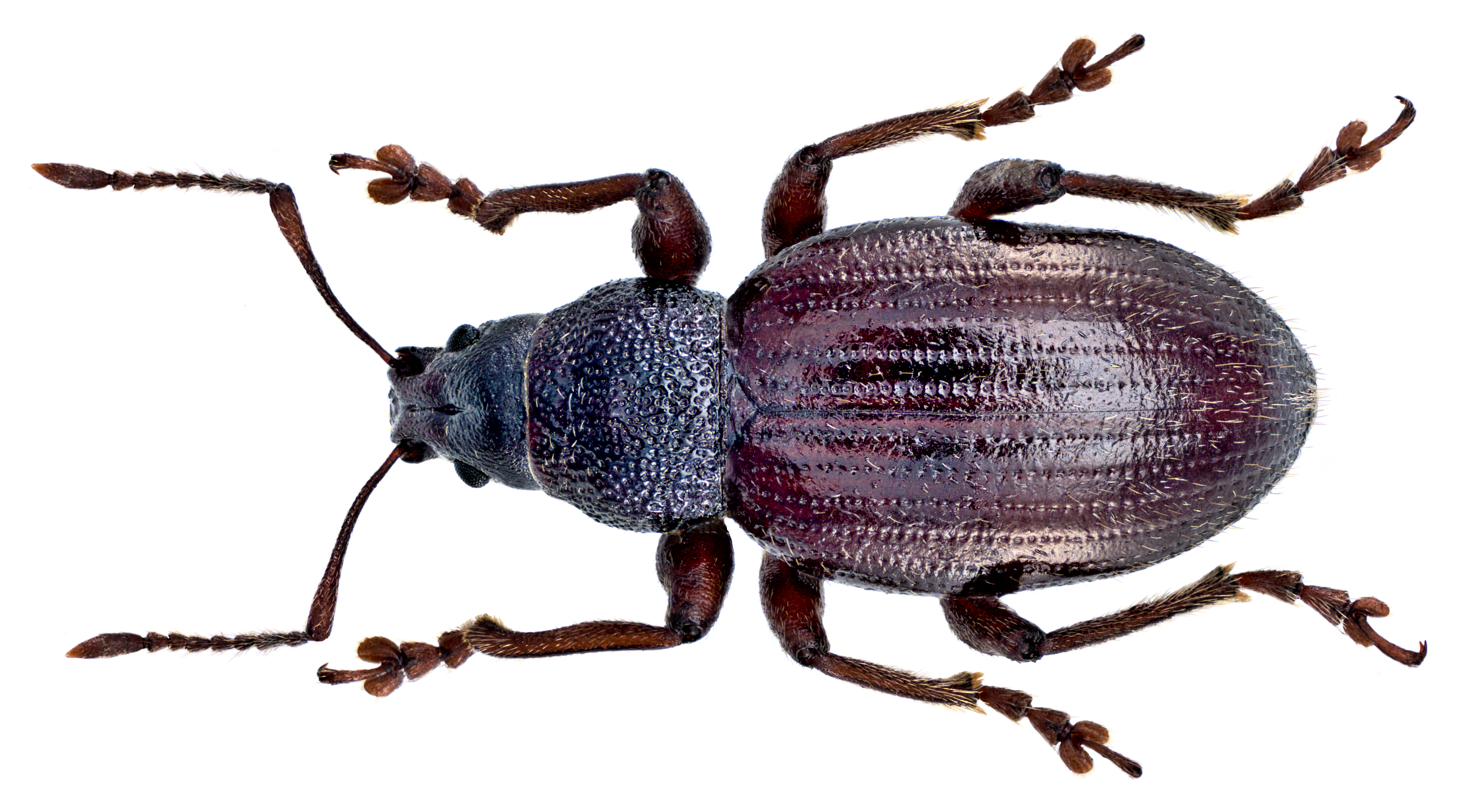
- Laparocerus canariensis

Scientific classification
- Kingdom: Animalia
- Phylum: Arthropoda
- Clade: Pancrustacea
- Class: Insecta
- Order: Coleoptera
- Suborder: Polyphaga
- Infraorder: Cucujiformia
- Superfamily: Curculionoidea
- Family: Curculionidae
- Subfamily: Entiminae
- Tribe: Laparocerini; Lacordaire, 1863

Genera
- See text

= Laparocerini =

Tribe of beetles

Laparocerini is a weevil tribe in the subfamily Entiminae.

== Genera ==
- Aphyonotus Faust, 1895
- Asmaratrox Heller, 1909
- Laparocerus Schoenherr, 1834
- Moreiba Alonso-Zarazaga, 2013
- Straticus Pascoe, 1886
