= Ophtalmorrhynchini =

Scientific classification
- Kingdom: Animalia
- Phylum: Arthropoda
- Class: Insecta
- Order: Coleoptera
- Suborder: Polyphaga
- Infraorder: Cucujiformia
- Family: Curculionidae
- Subfamily: Entiminae
- Tribe: Ophtalmorrhynchini; Hoffmann, 1965

Genera
- Ophtalmorrhynchus

Tribe of beetles

Ophtalmorrhynchini is a weevil tribe in the subfamily Entiminae.
