= Mesostylini =

Scientific classification
- Kingdom: Animalia
- Phylum: Arthropoda
- Class: Insecta
- Order: Coleoptera
- Suborder: Polyphaga
- Infraorder: Cucujiformia
- Family: Curculionidae
- Subfamily: Entiminae
- Tribe: Mesostylini; Reitter, 1913

Genera
- See text

Tribe of beetles

Mesostylini is a weevil tribe in the subfamily Entiminae.

== Genera ==
Amesostylus – Kasakhstania – Mesostylus – Parastylus
