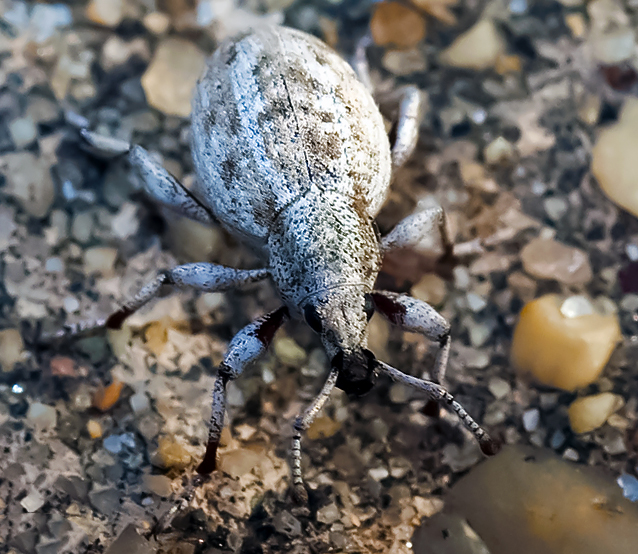
- Agraphus bellicus

Scientific classification
- Kingdom: Animalia
- Phylum: Arthropoda
- Clade: Pancrustacea
- Class: Insecta
- Order: Coleoptera
- Suborder: Polyphaga
- Infraorder: Cucujiformia
- Superfamily: Curculionoidea
- Family: Curculionidae
- Genus: Agraphus; Say, 1831
- Species: A. bellicus

Binomial name
- Agraphus bellicus (Say, 1831)

Synonyms
- Peritelus bellicus Say, 1831; Agraphus leucophoeus Gyllenhal, 1834

= Agraphus =

Genus of beetles

Agraphus is a genus of broad-nosed weevils in the beetle family Curculionidae. The genus is monotypic, the sole species being Agraphus bellicus. It is found in the eastern United States from Florida to New York.
