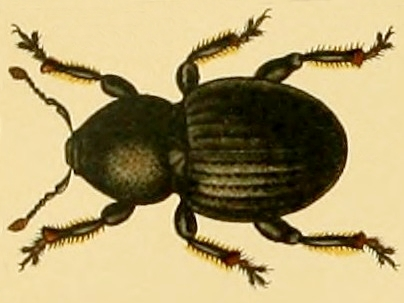
- Psalidium maxillosum

Scientific classification
- Kingdom: Animalia
- Phylum: Arthropoda
- Class: Insecta
- Order: Coleoptera
- Suborder: Polyphaga
- Infraorder: Cucujiformia
- Family: Curculionidae
- Subfamily: Entiminae
- Tribe: Psallidiini; Lacordaire, 1863

Genera
- See text

= Psallidiini =

Tribe of beetles

Psallidiini is a weevil tribe in the subfamily Entiminae.

== Genera ==
Psallidium – Sphingorrhinotus
