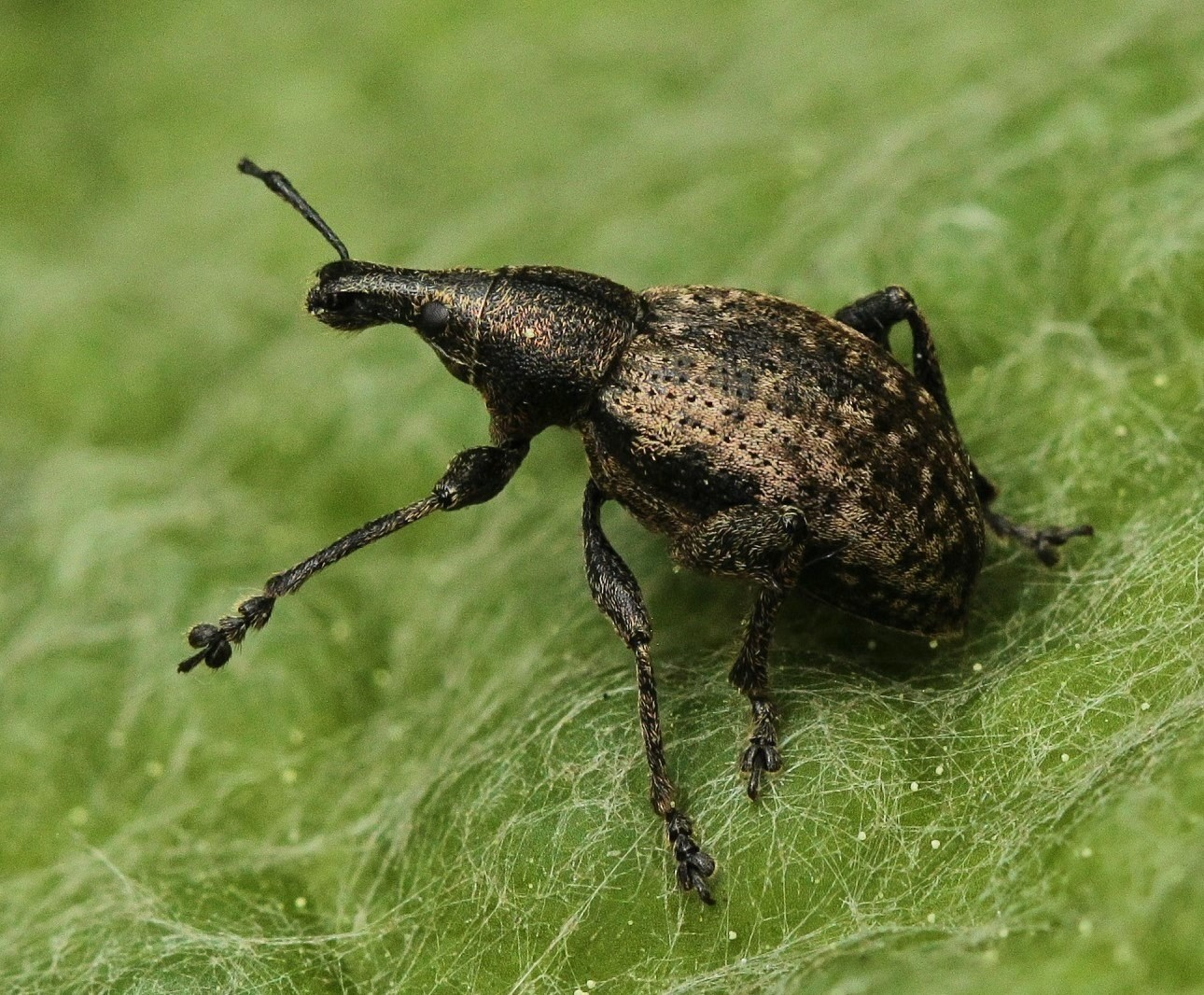
- Nastus fausti, Russia

Scientific classification
- Kingdom: Animalia
- Phylum: Arthropoda
- Class: Insecta
- Order: Coleoptera
- Suborder: Polyphaga
- Infraorder: Cucujiformia
- Family: Curculionidae
- Subfamily: Entiminae
- Tribe: Nastini; Reitter, 1913
- Genus: Nastus; Schoenherr, 1843

Synonyms
- Neonastus Arzanov & Davidian, 1995

= Nastus (beetle) =

Genus of beetles

Nastus is a genus of broad-nosed weevils in the beetle family Curculionidae. There are more than 30 described species in Nastus.

== Species ==
These 37 species belong to the genus Nastus:

- Nastus albinae Formánek, 1909
- Nastus albolineatus Formánek, 1909
- Nastus amoebaeus Suvorov, 1912
- Nastus anatolicus Smreczyński, 1972
- Nastus balkaricus Arzanov & Davidian, 1995
- Nastus beatus Faust, 1883
- Nastus carinicollis Braun, 1993
- Nastus concinnus Faust, 1883
- Nastus costatus Formánek, 1909
- Nastus devians Faust, 1883
- Nastus fausti Reitter, 1888
- Nastus goryi Boheman, 1842
- Nastus helleri Formánek, 1909
- Nastus heydeni Formánek, 1909
- Nastus humatus (Germar, 1823)
- Nastus kaszabi Bajtenov, 1973
- Nastus kraatzi Faust, 1891
- Nastus kuschakewitschi Faust, 1883
- Nastus lajlensis Arzanov & Davidian, 1995
- Nastus latifrons Formánek, 1909
- Nastus lineatus Faust, 1887
- Nastus lokayi Formánek, 1909
- Nastus longicornis Formánek, 1909
- Nastus luteosquamosus Heyden, 1885
- Nastus macedonicus Braun, 1993
- Nastus mucoreus Formánek, 1909
- Nastus nubiculosus (Schoenherr, 1832)
- Nastus oschanini Faust, 1894
- Nastus prolixus Faust, 1887
- Nastus relictus Bajtenov, 1980
- Nastus seidlitzi Faust, 1883
- Nastus sirdariensis Bajtenov, 1974
- Nastus stierlini Faust, 1883
- Nastus sulcifrons Formánek, 1909
- Nastus tessellatus Suvorov, 1912
- Nastus tigrinus Faust, 1883
- Nastus trapecicolloides Braun, 1993
