= Typhlorhinini =

Scientific classification
- Domain: Eukaryota
- Kingdom: Animalia
- Phylum: Arthropoda
- Class: Insecta
- Order: Coleoptera
- Suborder: Polyphaga
- Infraorder: Cucujiformia
- Family: Curculionidae
- Subfamily: Entiminae
- Tribe: Typhlorhinini; Kuschel, 1954

Genera
- See text

Tribe of beetles

Typhlorhinini is a weevil tribe in the subfamily Entiminae.

== Genera ==
Cambefortinus – Cephalorostris – Hapactorrhynchus – Scrobops
