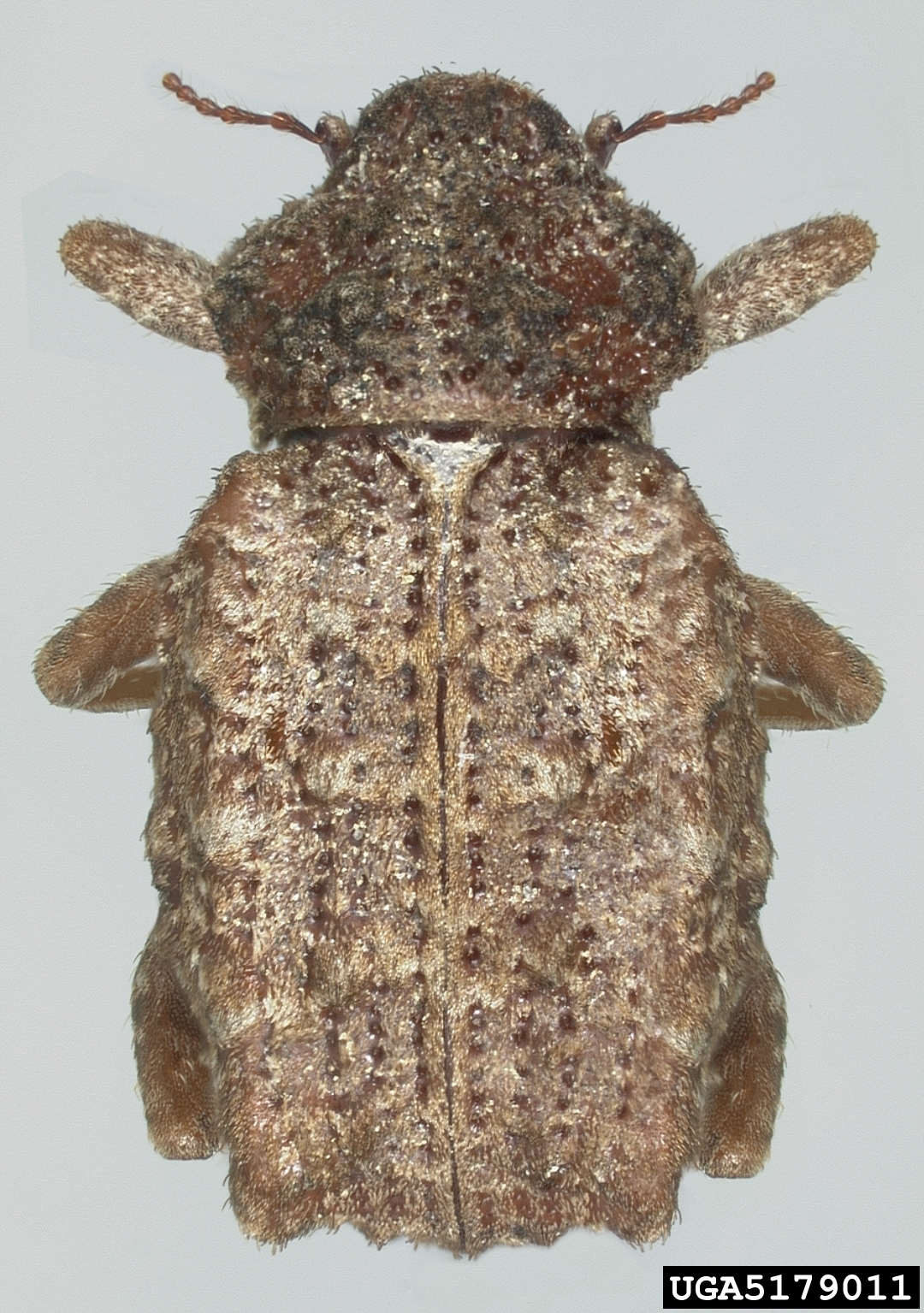
- Premnotrypes vorax

Scientific classification
- Kingdom: Animalia
- Phylum: Arthropoda
- Clade: Pancrustacea
- Class: Insecta
- Order: Coleoptera
- Suborder: Polyphaga
- Infraorder: Cucujiformia
- Superfamily: Curculionoidea
- Family: Curculionidae
- Subfamily: Entiminae
- Tribe: Premnotrypini; Kuschel, 1956

Genera
- See text

= Premnotrypini =

Tribe of beetles

Premnotrypini is a weevil tribe in the subfamily Entiminae.

== Genera ==
Microtrypes – Premnotrypes – Rhinotrypes
