= Rhyncogonus bryani =

Conservation status
- Extinct (yes) (IUCN 3.1)

Scientific classification
- Kingdom: Animalia
- Phylum: Arthropoda
- Clade: Pancrustacea
- Class: Insecta
- Order: Coleoptera
- Suborder: Polyphaga
- Infraorder: Cucujiformia
- Family: Curculionidae
- Genus: Rhyncogonus
- Species: †R. bryani

Binomial name
- †Rhyncogonus bryani Perkins, 1919

Species of beetle

Rhyncogonus bryani is an extinct species of beetle in the family Curculionidae. It was endemic to Laysan in the Hawaiian Islands
