= Holcorhinini =

Scientific classification
- Kingdom: Animalia
- Phylum: Arthropoda
- Class: Insecta
- Order: Coleoptera
- Suborder: Polyphaga
- Infraorder: Cucujiformia
- Family: Curculionidae
- Subfamily: Entiminae
- Tribe: Holcorhinini; Desbrochers, 1898

Genera
- See text

Tribe of beetles

Holcorhinini is a weevil tribe in the subfamily Entiminae.

== Genera ==
Acoenopsimorphus – Atoporhynchus – Chiloneonasus – Coenopsimorphus – Cyclobarus – Cyclomaurus – Cycloptochus – Cyrtolepus – Eptacus – Euplatinus – Holcophloeus – Holcorhinus – Nucterocephalus – Paracyclomaurus – Periteloneus – Pimelorrhinas – Ritelepus
