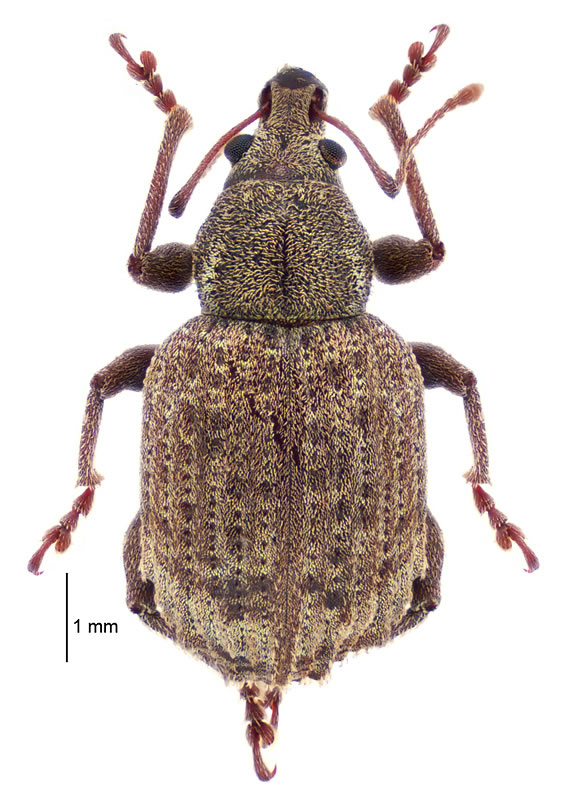
- Phlyctinus callosus

Scientific classification
- Domain: Eukaryota
- Kingdom: Animalia
- Phylum: Arthropoda
- Class: Insecta
- Order: Coleoptera
- Suborder: Polyphaga
- Infraorder: Cucujiformia
- Family: Curculionidae
- Subfamily: Entiminae
- Tribe: Oosomini; Lacordaire, 1863

Genera
- See text

= Oosomini =

Tribe of beetles

Oosomini is a tribe of weevils in the subfamily Entiminae.

== Genera ==
- Barianus
- Basothorhynchus
- Brachycyclus
- Bryochaeta
- Catalalus
- Chalepoderus
- Cladeyterus
- Cosmorhinus
- Cycliscus
- Ellimenistes
- Ellimorrhinus
- Eurhynchomys
- Glyptosomus
- Holcolaccus
- Neobrachyocyrtus
- Neobryocheta
- Oosomus
- Periderces
- Phlyctinus
- Piezoderes
- Porpacus
- Pyctoderes
- Rhysoderes
- Syntaptocerus
