= Embrithini =

Scientific classification
- Domain: Eukaryota
- Kingdom: Animalia
- Phylum: Arthropoda
- Class: Insecta
- Order: Coleoptera
- Suborder: Polyphaga
- Infraorder: Cucujiformia
- Family: Curculionidae
- Subfamily: Entiminae
- Tribe: Embrithini; Marshall, 1942

Genera
- See text

Tribe of beetles

Embrithini is a weevil tribe in the subfamily Entiminae.

== Genera ==
Adiatmetus – Adorhabdotus – Amphitmetus – Anentypotrachelus – Aperitmetus – Babaultia – Cadoderus – Chelyophyes – Cissodicasticus – Dicasticus – Embrithes – Embrithodes – Entypotrachelus – Epibrithus – Epicasticus – Epipedosoma – Eupiona – Gakmetus – Holoprosopus – Hypertmetus – Ischnobrotus – Leuroscapus – Machaerorrhinas – Mecomerinthus – Merulla – Merullodes – Mesphrigodes – Metaplesias – Mimaptomerus – Neosphrigodes – Oncophyes – Opseodes – Opseotrophus – Paratmetus – Peribrotus – Peritelomus – Peritmetus – Perrinella – Plocometopus – Polyrhabdotus – Procasticus – Pseudisaniris – Pternogymnus – Rhadinoscapus – Rhyncholobus – Simodes – Sphrigodellus – Sphrigodes – Stenorrhamphus – Trepimetas
