= Elytrurini =

Scientific classification
- Domain: Eukaryota
- Kingdom: Animalia
- Phylum: Arthropoda
- Class: Insecta
- Order: Coleoptera
- Suborder: Polyphaga
- Infraorder: Cucujiformia
- Family: Curculionidae
- Subfamily: Entiminae
- Tribe: Elytrurini; Marshall, 1956

Genera
- See text

Tribe of beetles

Elytrurini is a weevil tribe in the subfamily Entiminae.

== Genera ==
Amphionotus – Anomalodermus – Desmelytrurus – Elytrurus – Epizorus – Gaynaria
