= Nothognathini =

Scientific classification
- Domain: Eukaryota
- Kingdom: Animalia
- Phylum: Arthropoda
- Class: Insecta
- Order: Coleoptera
- Suborder: Polyphaga
- Infraorder: Cucujiformia
- Family: Curculionidae
- Subfamily: Entiminae
- Tribe: Nothognathini; Marshall, 1916

Genera
- Lathrotiorrhynchus Voss, 1964; Nothognathus Marshall, 1916

Tribe of beetles

Nothognathini is a weevil tribe in the subfamily Entiminae.
