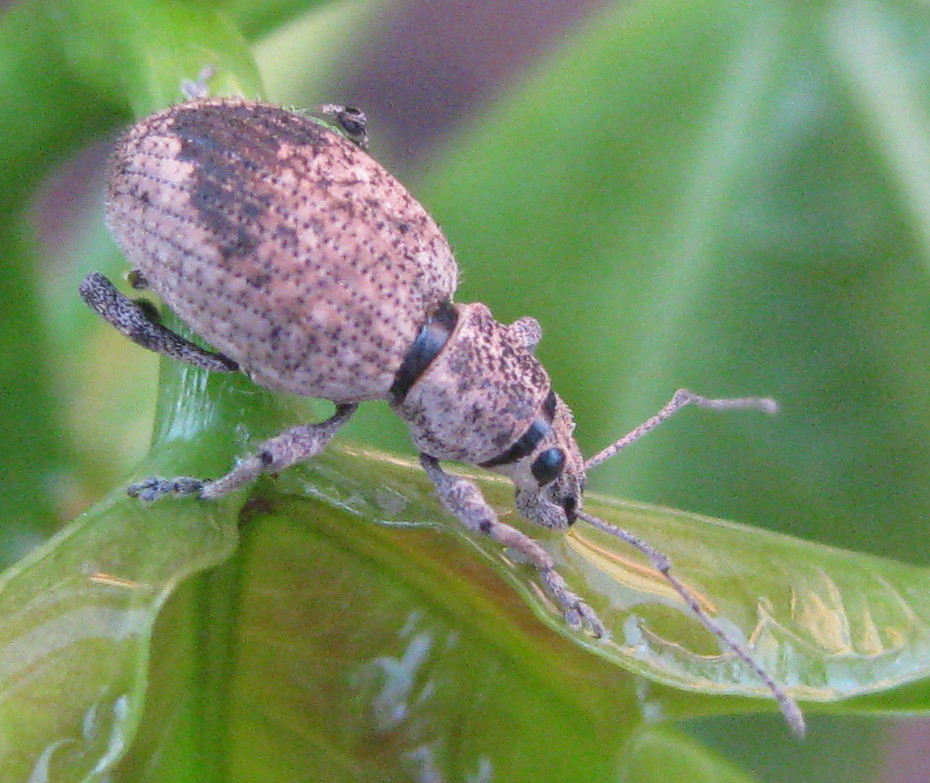
- Adult of unidentified Protostrophus species, Chimoio, Mozambique

Scientific classification
- Kingdom: Animalia
- Phylum: Arthropoda
- Clade: Pancrustacea
- Class: Insecta
- Order: Coleoptera
- Suborder: Polyphaga
- Infraorder: Cucujiformia
- Superfamily: Curculionoidea
- Family: Curculionidae
- Subfamily: Entiminae
- Tribe: Cneorhinini; Lacordaire, 1863

Genera
- See text

= Cneorhinini =

Tribe of beetles

The Cneorhinini are a tribe of weevils in the subfamily Entiminae.

== Genera ==
- Acherdus
- Analeurops
- Anaptoplus
- Ansorus
- Ascopus
- Attactagenus
- Bletonius
- Catapionus
- Cneorhinus
- Cneorrhinicollis
- Dermatoxenus
- Ectatopsides
- Embolodes
- Eucrines
- Euonychus
- Fleurops
- Formanekia
- Gypopnychus
- Haplocopes
- Heteroschoinus
- Heterostylus
- Heydeneonymus
- Leptolepurus
- Leurops
- Mestorus
- Mimaulus
- Mutocneorrhinus
- Nodierella
- Oenassus
- Omotrachelus
- Philetaerobius
- Philopedon
- Polydius
- Pomphoplesius
- Pomphus
- Proictes
- Protostrophus
- Pseudoblosyrus
- Pseudoneliocarus
- Pseudopantomorus
- Pseudoproictes
- Pseudoscolochirus
- Pseuonyx
- Rhadinocopes
- Scolochirus
- Synaptocephalodes
- Synaptocephalus
- Tanysomus

Stigmatrachelus, usually placed in the related tribe Dermatodini, is sometimes included in the Cneorhinini instead.
