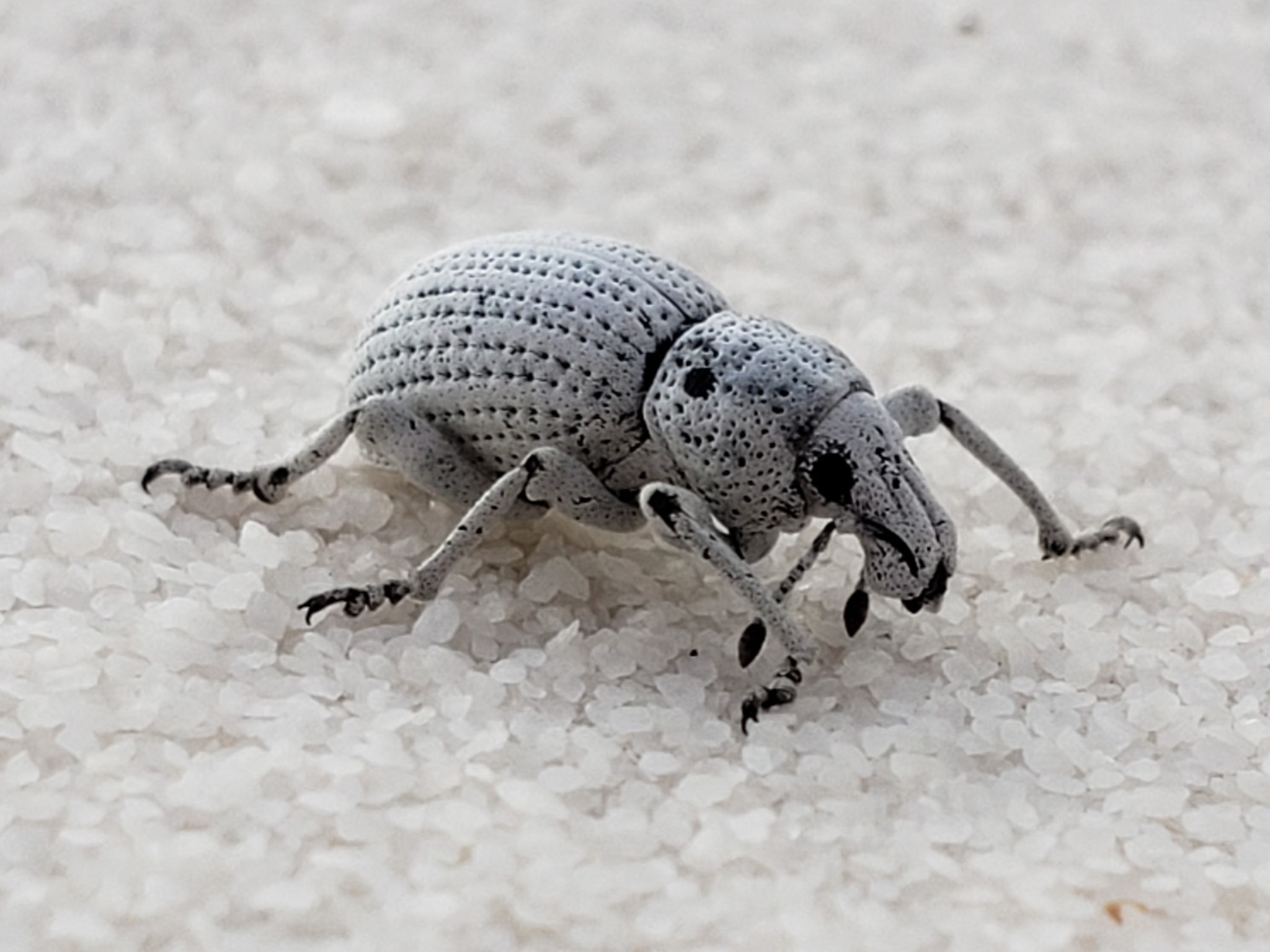

Scientific classification
- Kingdom: Animalia
- Phylum: Arthropoda
- Clade: Pancrustacea
- Class: Insecta
- Order: Coleoptera
- Suborder: Polyphaga
- Infraorder: Cucujiformia
- Superfamily: Curculionoidea
- Family: Curculionidae
- Subfamily: Entiminae
- Tribe: Ophryastini; Lacordaire, 1863

= Ophryastini =

Tribe of beetles

Ophryastini is a weevil tribe in the subfamily Entiminae. There are about 4 genera with 90 species in Ophryastini, found in North America, Asia, and Europe.

== Genera ==
These four genera belong to the tribe Ophryastini:

- Deracanthus Schönherr, 1823
- Ophryastes Germar, 1829
- Sapotes Casey, 1888
- † Ophryastites Scudder, 1893
