= Rhyncogonini =

Scientific classification
- Kingdom: Animalia
- Phylum: Arthropoda
- Clade: Pancrustacea
- Class: Insecta
- Order: Coleoptera
- Suborder: Polyphaga
- Infraorder: Cucujiformia
- Superfamily: Curculionoidea
- Family: Curculionidae
- Subfamily: Entiminae
- Tribe: Rhyncogonini; Sharp, 1919

Genera
- See text

Tribe of beetles

Rhyncogonini is a weevil tribe in the subfamily Entiminae.

== Genera ==
Microgonus – Psomeles – Rhyncogonus
