= W. Dwight Pierce =

American entomologist (1881–1967)

William Dwight Pierce (November 16, 1881, Champaign, Illinois – April 29, 1967, Los Angeles) was an American entomologist.

He was one of the earliest students to graduate from the Department of Entomology and Ornithology at the University of Nebraska. He worked as an entomologist at the Los Angeles County Museum (now the Natural History Museum of Los Angeles County). He was particularly interested in insect pests, including the cotton boll weevil, and their control. Mainly between 1904 and 1931, he published numerous scientific papers and other works on the topic; perhaps the most significant being the book Sanitary Entomology (1921), of which a sixth edition was published in 2010. Pierce also studied Strepsiptera and described numerous species and genera.

During the late 1930s, he taught entomology at Glendale Junior College in Los Angeles; where he influenced Charles Anthony Fleschner, who went on to have a distinguished career in entomology at University of California, Riverside. Some materials relating to Pierce are held in the collection of the Natural History Museum of Los Angeles County.

The weevil species Premnotrypes piercei and Rhigopsidius piercei have been named in his honor.
