= Lordopini =

Scientific classification
- Domain: Eukaryota
- Kingdom: Animalia
- Phylum: Arthropoda
- Class: Insecta
- Order: Coleoptera
- Suborder: Polyphaga
- Infraorder: Cucujiformia
- Family: Curculionidae
- Subfamily: Entiminae
- Tribe: Lordopini; Schönherr, 1823

Genera
- See text

Tribe of beetles

Lordopini is a weevil tribe in the subfamily Entiminae.

== Genera ==
Acanthobrachis – Aeuryomus – Alocorhinus – Anidopsis – Atomorhinus – Aulametopus – Conidus – Conothorax – Deroconus – Diaprosomus – Dioryrhinus – Elytroxys – Eudmetus – Eurylobus – Euryomus – Euscapus – Euthyreus – Eutypus – Granadia – Hemieuryomus – Hypoptophila – Hypoptus – Hypsonotolobus – Hypsonotus – Lasiocnemoides – Lasiopus – Leptodomus – Lordopella – Lordops – Merodontus – Microstictius – Nesolordops – Omoionotus – Orthocnemus – Pachyconus – Prasocella – Pseudhypoptus – Rescapus – Stenorhinus – Sulla – Tomometopus – Tomorhinus – Trichocnemus – Tropidorrhinus
