= Blosyrini =

Scientific classification
- Domain: Eukaryota
- Kingdom: Animalia
- Phylum: Arthropoda
- Class: Insecta
- Order: Coleoptera
- Suborder: Polyphaga
- Infraorder: Cucujiformia
- Family: Curculionidae
- Subfamily: Entiminae
- Tribe: Blosyrini; Lacordaire, 1863

Genera
- See text

Tribe of beetles

The Blosyrini comprise a weevil tribe in the subfamily Entiminae.

== Genera ==
- Blosyrodes
- Blosyrosoma
- Blosyrus
- Bradybamon
- Dactylotus
- Holonychus
- Proscephaladeres
