= Myorhinini =

Scientific classification
- Domain: Eukaryota
- Kingdom: Animalia
- Phylum: Arthropoda
- Class: Insecta
- Order: Coleoptera
- Suborder: Polyphaga
- Infraorder: Cucujiformia
- Family: Curculionidae
- Subfamily: Entiminae
- Tribe: Myorhinini; Marseul, 1863

Genera
- See text

Tribe of beetles

Myorhinini is a weevil tribe in the subfamily Entiminae.

== Genera ==
Anathresa – Aneremnodes – Apsis – Bicodes – Echinocnemodes – Ephimerostylus – Epipolaionyx – Eremnodes – Eudraces – Goniorhinus – Haptomerus – Holorygma – Lecanophora – Malosomus – Nastomma – Neobicodes – Opseorhinus – Parepeigorrhinus – Pareremnodes – Parhaptomerus – Siereorrhynchus – Stereorhynchus – Subhaptomerus – Sympiezorhynchus – Umzila – Zeugorygma
