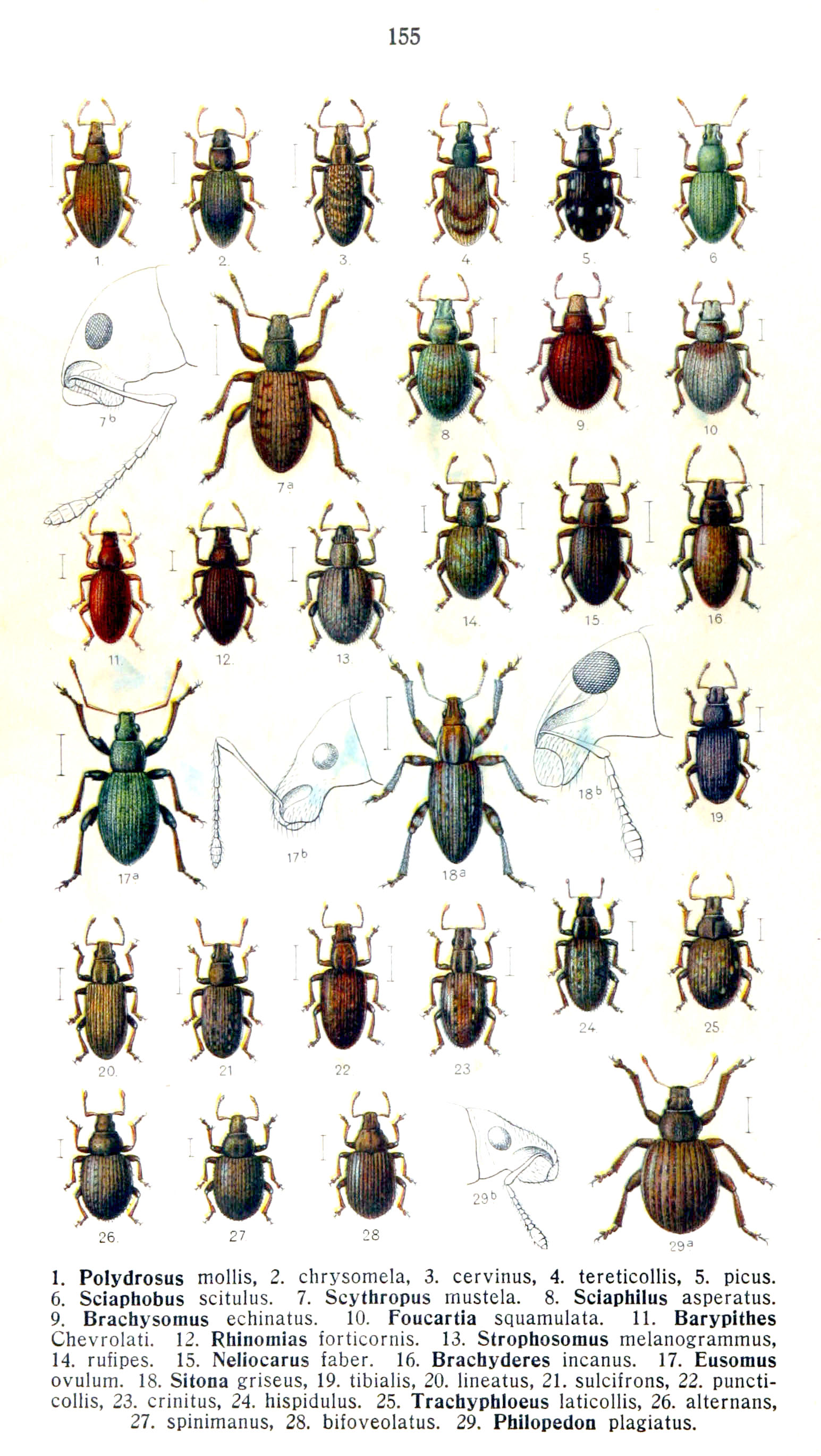
- Central European Entiminae, with some anatomical details

Scientific classification
- Kingdom: Animalia
- Phylum: Arthropoda
- Clade: Pancrustacea
- Class: Insecta
- Order: Coleoptera
- Suborder: Polyphaga
- Infraorder: Cucujiformia
- Superfamily: Curculionoidea
- Family: Curculionidae
- Subfamily: Entiminae; Schoenherr, 1826

Diversity
- 55 tribes

= Entiminae =

Subfamily of beetles

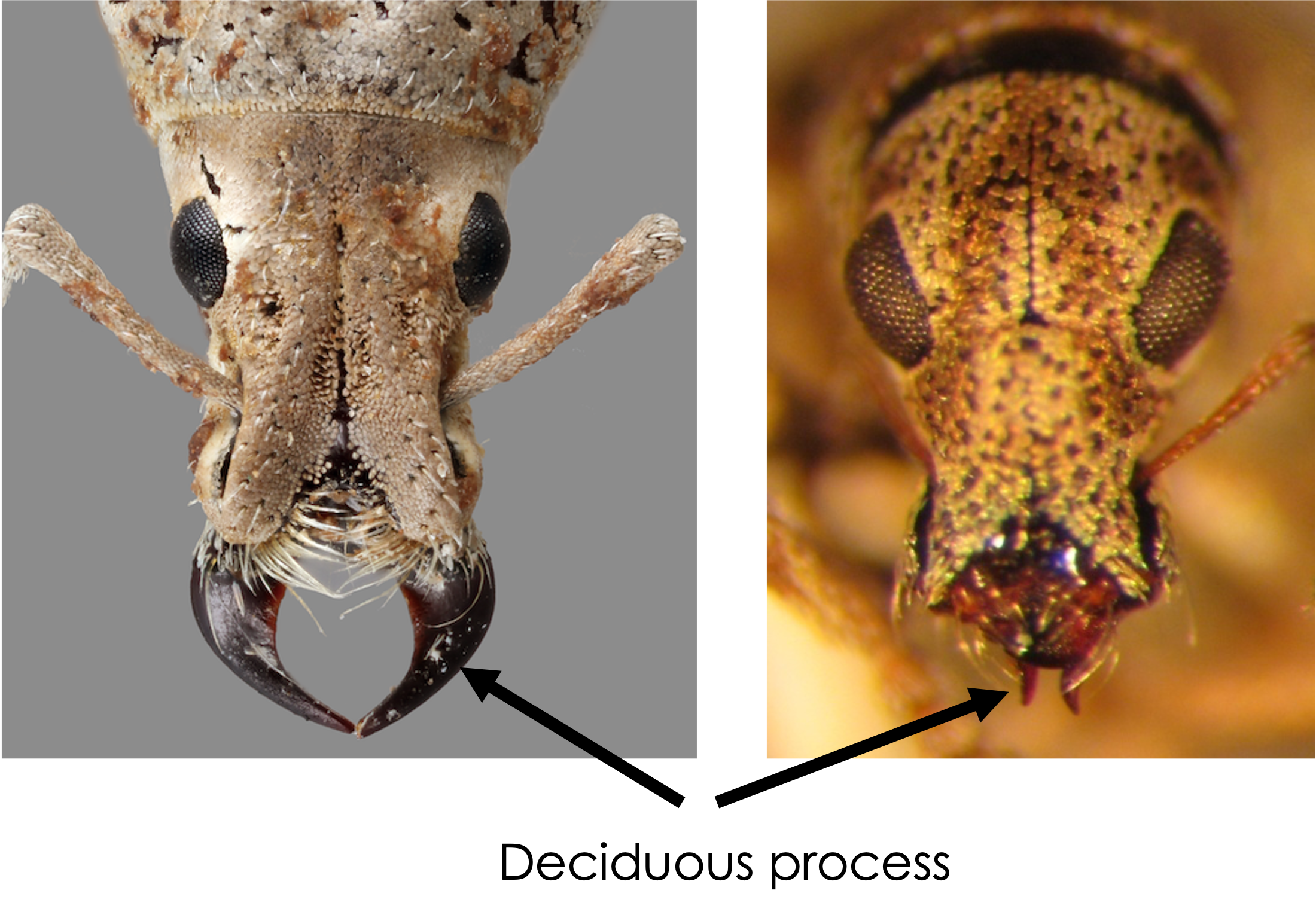
Dorsal views of the head of Compsus auricephalus (Eustylini) and Apodrosus quisqueyanus (Polydrusini) showing their deciduous processes.

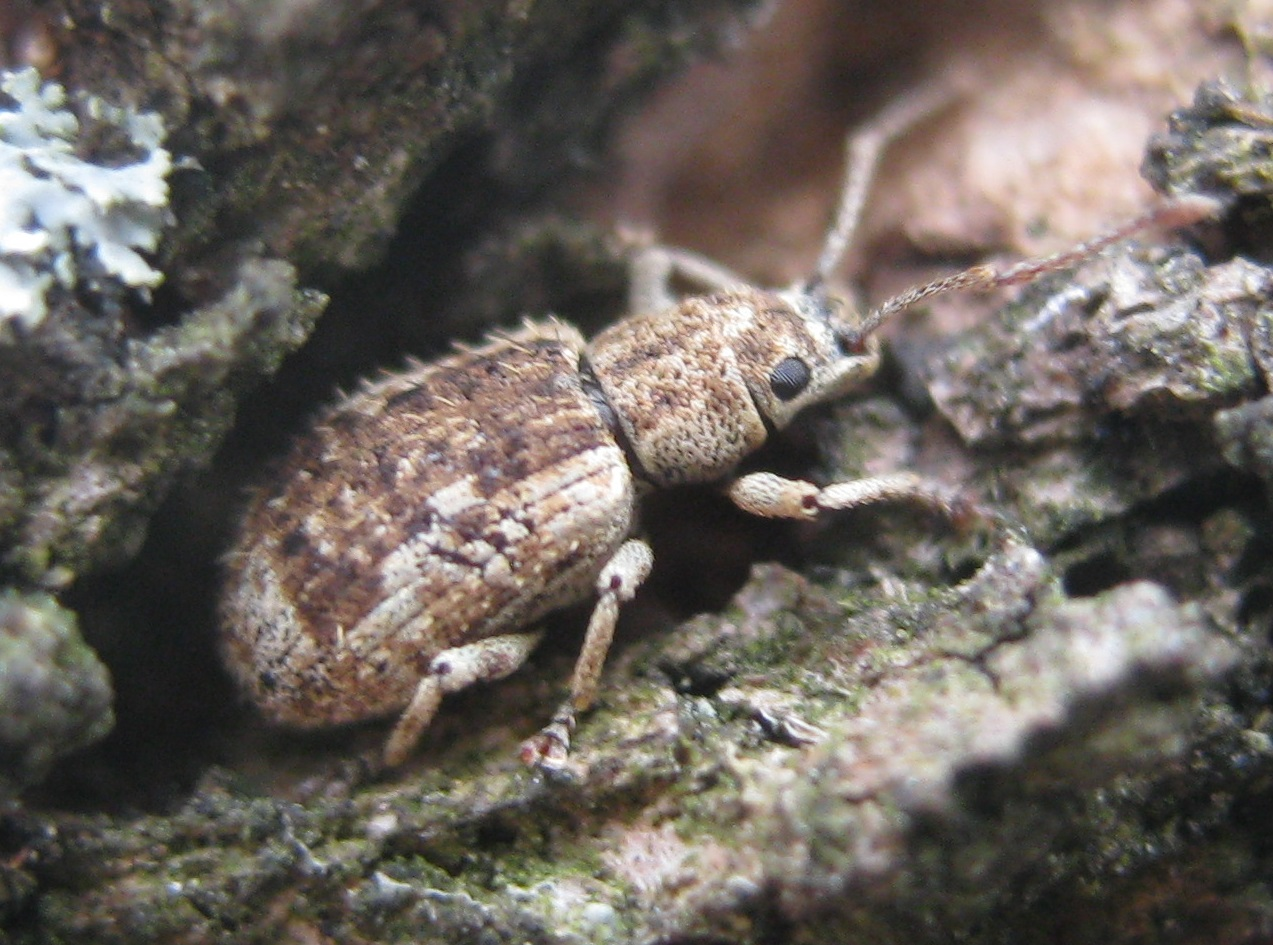
Pseudoedophrys hilleri

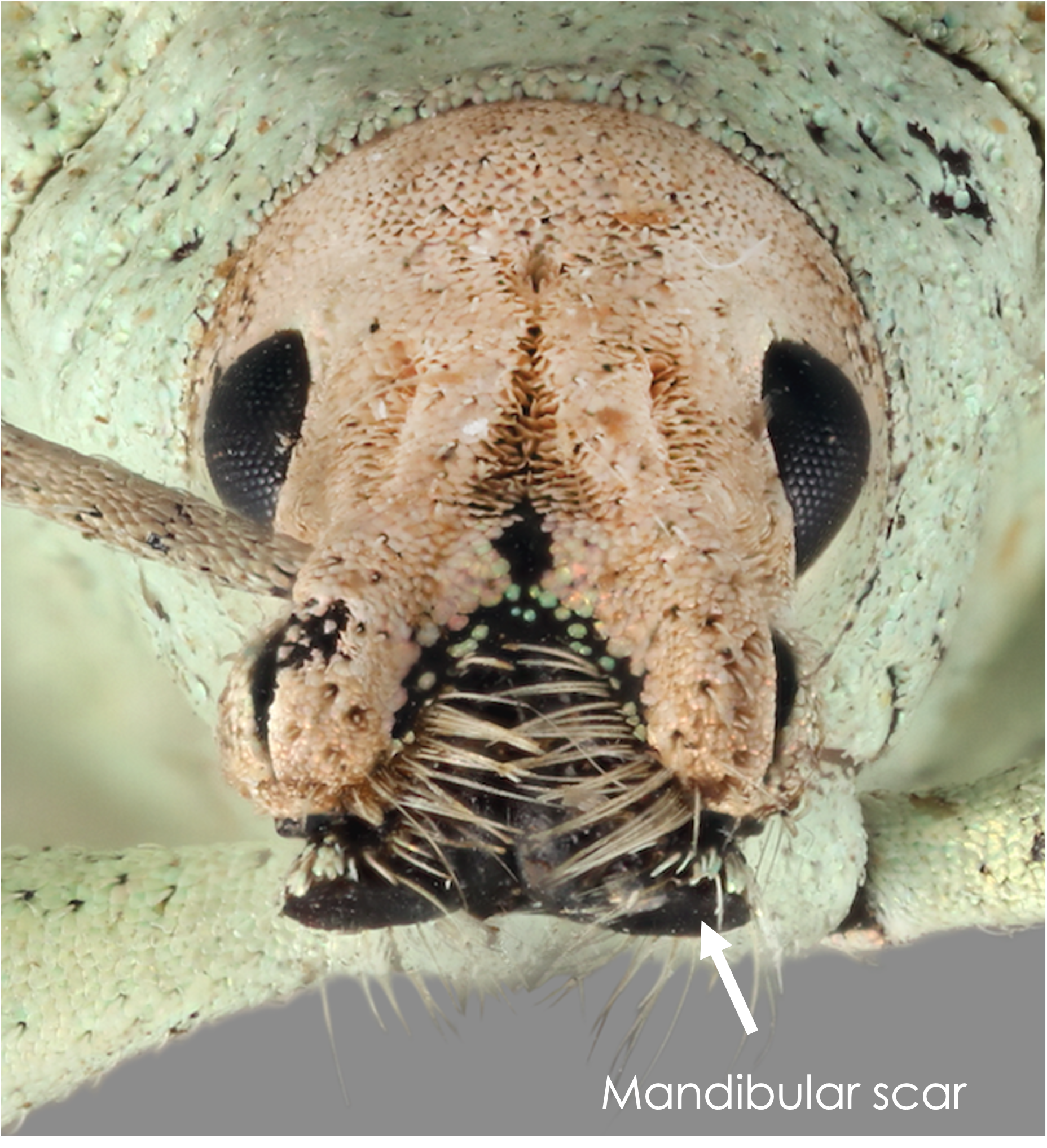
Head of Compsus auricephalus indicating mandibular scar.

The Entiminae, or broad-nosed weevils, are a large subfamily in the weevil family Curculionidae, containing most of the short-nosed weevils, including such genera as Entimus, Otiorhynchus, Phyllobius, Sitona, and Pachyrrhynchus. In comparison with their stunning diversity, only a few of these weevils are notorious pests of major economic importance. Entimines are commonly encountered in the field, including urban environments, and abundant in entomological collections.

== Diversity ==
There are over 12,000 described species in the Entiminae subfamily worldwide, distributed in over 1,370 genera, which total nearly 14,000 by more recent counts. Most tribes are represented in only one biogeographic region of the world. The current classification within the subfamily has been recognized as artificial rather than reflecting natural groups.

== General morphology ==
Besides the shape of their broad and short rostrum, most entimines are easily recognized by the presence of a mandibular scar that appears when a deciduous process falls off the mandible, shortly after the emergence of the adult from the pupal stage.

== Ecology ==
In general, entimines tend to feed on a broad range of plants (polyphagous), but there are instances of oligophagy. In general, the larvae feed externally on roots in the soil and adults feed on foliage. They also show preference for habitat or substrate rather than plant specificity.

Entimine weevils are primarily associated with angiosperms, but there are also species recorded from gymnosperms. They feed on monocotyledonous and a broad range of dicotyledoneous plants, including members of the families Fabaceae, Malvaceae, Rutaceae, Solanaceae, and many more.

The most commonly seen/known species are usually those associated with vegetation, where there is a trend to find more abundance and less diversity in cultivated areas, whereas forested or less disturbed areas tend to have more diversity and less abundance; there is a lot of diversity represented in the soil and on leaf litter, which is often overlooked.

The most effective method for collecting entimines from vegetation is with a beating sheet or by manual collecting; for soil entimines the best method is leaf litter sifting.

== Biology ==
Entimines may lay eggs loosely on the substrate, or in clusters glued onto the vegetation and do not use their rostrum to prepare their oviposition site. Over 50 species of entimines have been reported as parthenogenetic.

The integument of entimines can be black, reddish, orange and even metallic in coloration. Many species of Entiminae are covered by scales arranged in a broad variety of patterns. Those scales bear three dimensional photonic crystals within their lumen, which makes the scales iridescent.

Many species are flightless, which usually can be seen externally: the elytral shoulders (outer anterior corners of the elytra) are reduced to absent in apterous and brachypterous forms and well-developed in species with well-developed wings.

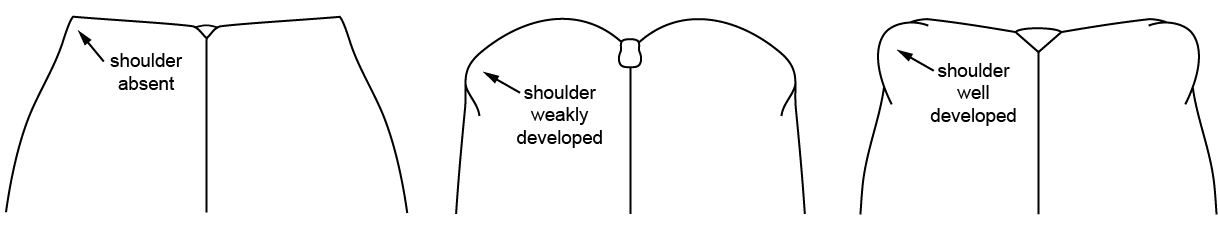
Variation on development of elytral shoulders in entimine weevils.

== Tribes ==
The current tribal classification of Entiminae follows Alonso-Zarazaga & Lyal for the most part, with a few updates by Bouchard et al. The latest tribal addition is the Namaini Borovec & Meregalli. Currently, there are 55 tribes recognized in the subfamily.

A key to identify tribes is presented by Legalov.

- Agraphini
- Alophini
- Anomophthalmini
- Anypotactini
- Blosyrini
- Brachyderini
- Celeuthetini
- Cneorhinini
- Cratopodini
- Cylydrorhinini
- Cyphicerini
- Dermatodini
- Ectemnorhinini
- Elytrurini
- Embrithini
- Entimini
- Episomini
- Eudiagogini
- Eupholini
- Eustylini
- Geonemini
- Holcorhinini
- Hormorini
- Laparocerini
- Leptostethini
- Lordopini
- Mesostylini
- Myorhinini
- Nastini
- Namaini
- Naupactini
- Nothognathini
- Omiini
- Oosomini
- Ophryastini
- Ophtalmorrhynchini
- Otiorhynchini
- Ottistirini
- Pachyrhynchini
- Peritelini
- Phyllobiini
- Polycatini
- Polydrusini
- Premnotrypini
- Pristorhynchini
- Prypnini
- Psallidiini
- Rhyncogonini
- Sciaphilini
- Sitonini
- Tanymecini
- Tanyrhynchini
- Thecesternini
- Trachyphloeini
- Tropiphorini
- Typhlorhinini
