= List of Polydrusus species =

This is a list of 225 species in Polydrusus, a genus of broad-nosed weevils in the family Curculionidae.

== Polydrusus species ==
- Polydrusus abbreviatus Desbrochers, 1871^{g}
- Polydrusus abeillei Desbrochers des Loges, 1869^{c g}
- Polydrusus acuminatus Champion, 1911^{c g}
- Polydrusus aeratus (Gravenhorst, 1807)^{c g}
- Polydrusus alaiensis (Faust, 1891)^{c g}
- Polydrusus alchemillae (Hustache, 1929)^{c g}
- Polydrusus alveolus Desbrochers, 1869
- Polydrusus americanus (Gyllenhal, 1834)^{i c g b}
- Polydrusus amoenus (Germar, 1824)^{c g}
- Polydrusus amplicollis Desbrochers des Loges, 1902^{c g}
- Polydrusus amplipennis Champion, 1911^{c g}
- Polydrusus analis Schilsky, 1910^{c g}
- Polydrusus anchoralifer (Chevrolat, 1859)^{c g}
- Polydrusus andalusicus Solari, 1954
- Polydrusus angustus (Lucas, 1854)^{c g}
- Polydrusus apfelbecki Solari, 1926
- Polydrusus archaetypus (Zherikhin, 1971)^{c g}
- Polydrusus armipes Brullé, 1832^{c g}
- Polydrusus asniensis (Hustache, 1933)^{c g}
- Polydrusus astutus Gyllenhal, 1834^{c g}
- Polydrusus atlasicus (Kocher, 1961)^{c g}
- Polydrusus augustalisi (Pic, 1910)^{c g}
- Polydrusus aurocupreus Gandhi & Pajni, 1984^{c g}
- Polydrusus auronitens (D'Amore-Fracassi, 1906)^{c g}
- Polydrusus balearicus (Voss, 1936)
- Polydrusus bardus Gyllenhal, 1834^{c g}
- Polydrusus bartolii Pesarini, 1975^{c g}
- Polydrusus baudii (Faust, 1889)^{c g}
- Polydrusus bedeli (Stierlin, 1884)^{c g}
- Polydrusus biovatus (Desbrochers des Loges, 1897)^{c g}
- Polydrusus bisphaericus (Desbrochers des Loges, 1897)^{c g}
- Polydrusus bodemeyeri (Reitter, 1903)^{c g}
- Polydrusus bohemani Kiesenwetter, 1852^{c g}
- Polydrusus brevicollis Desbrochers des Loges, 1872^{c g}
- Polydrusus brevipes (Kiesenwetter, 1864)^{c g}
- Polydrusus bulgaricus (Leonhard, 1912)^{c g}
- Polydrusus calabricus (Faust, 1890)^{c g}
- Polydrusus carpathicus Brancsik, 1874^{c g}
- Polydrusus castilianus K. Daniel & J. Daniel, 1898^{c g}
- Polydrusus caucasicus (Desbrochers des Loges, 1872)^{c g}
- Polydrusus cephalonicus Apfelbeck, 1922^{c g}
- Polydrusus cephalotes (Desbrochers des Loges, 1872)^{c g}
- Polydrusus cervinus (Linnaeus, 1758)
- Polydrusus chilensis Kuschel, 1950^{c g}
- Polydrusus chinensis (Kono & Morimoto, 1960)^{c g}
- Polydrusus chlorogaster Champion, 1911^{c g}
- Polydrusus chrysocephalodes Hustache, 1946^{c g}
- Polydrusus chrysocephalus (Chevrolat, 1859)^{c g}
- Polydrusus chrysomela (Olivier, 1807)^{c g}
- Polydrusus clermonti (Pic, 1919)^{c g}
- Polydrusus cocciferae Kiesenwetter, 1864^{c g}
- Polydrusus confluens Stephens, 1831
- Polydrusus constellatus (Voss, 1959)^{c g}
- Polydrusus corruscus Germar, 1824^{c g}
- Polydrusus cressius Pic, 1904^{c g}
- Polydrusus crinipes Germann, 2018^{c}
- Polydrusus cylindrithorax Desbrochers, 1900
- Polydrusus davatchii (Hoffmann, 1956)^{c g}
- Polydrusus decoratus Woodruff, 1923^{i c g}
- Polydrusus delicatulus Horn, 1894^{c g}
- Polydrusus demoflysi Normand, 1951^{c g}
- Polydrusus deplanatus (Schilsky, 1910)^{c g}
- Polydrusus derosasi Zumpt, 1933^{c g}
- Polydrusus desbrochersi (Stierlin, 1884)^{c g}
- Polydrusus dilutus Motschulsky, 1849^{c g}
- Polydrusus djarkentensis (Voss, 1940)^{c g}
- Polydrusus dohrni (Faust, 1882)^{c g}
- Polydrusus elegans Reitter, 1887
- Polydrusus elegantulus (Boheman, 1840)^{c g}
- Polydrusus emmae J. Müller, 1925^{c g}
- Polydrusus eusomoides (Desbrochers des Loges, 1899)^{c g}
- Polydrusus faillai Desbrochers, 1889^{g}
- Polydrusus falsosus (Hoffmann, 1963)^{c g}
- Polydrusus femoratus (Stierlin, 1888)^{g}
- Polydrusus ferrugineus (Boheman, 1840)^{c g}
- Polydrusus festae (F. Solari, 1925)^{c g}
- Polydrusus flavipes (De Geer, 1775)
- Polydrusus flavonotatus Champion, 1911^{c g}
- Polydrusus formosus (Mayer, 1779)^{c g b} (green immigrant leaf weevil)
- Polydrusus frater (Rottenberg, 1871)^{c g}
- Polydrusus freyi (Zumpt, 1933)^{c g}
- Polydrusus fulvicornis (Fabricius, 1792)^{c g}
- Polydrusus fusciclava (Desbrochers des Loges, 1908)^{c g}
- Polydrusus fuscofasciatus Champion, 1911^{c g}
- Polydrusus fuscoroseus Desbrochers, 1871
- Polydrusus fuscus (Marshall, 1953)^{c g}
- Polydrusus gemmifer (Guillebeau, 1897)^{c g}
- Polydrusus glabratus (Gyllenhal, 1834)^{c g}
- Polydrusus gracilicornis Kiesenwetter, 1864^{g}
- Polydrusus grandiceps (Desbrochers des Loges, 1875)^{c g}
- Polydrusus griseomaculatus Desbrochers des Loges, 1869^{c g}
- Polydrusus guadelupensis Hustache, 1929^{c g}
- Polydrusus hassayampus Sleeper, 1957^{i c g b}
- Polydrusus henoni (Allard, 1869)^{c g}
- Polydrusus hirsutipennis (Pic, 1908)^{c g}
- Polydrusus hoppei (Apfelbeck, 1922)^{c g}
- Polydrusus ibericus Stierlin, 1884^{c g}
- Polydrusus iliensis (Bajtenov, 1974)^{c g}
- Polydrusus immaculatus Champion, 1911^{c g}
- Polydrusus impar Gozis, 1882^{c g}
- Polydrusus impressifrons (Gyllenhal, 1834)^{i c g b} (pale green weevil)
- Polydrusus inopinatus (Binaghi, 1968)^{c g}
- Polydrusus interstitialis Perris, 1864^{c g}
- Polydrusus inustus Germar, 1824^{c g}
- Polydrusus ischnotracheloides (Hustache, 1939)^{c g}
- Polydrusus isshikii (Kono, 1930)^{c g}
- Polydrusus japonicus (Hustache, 1920)^{c g}
- Polydrusus jucundus Miller, 1862^{c g}
- Polydrusus julianus (Reitter, 1916)^{c g}
- Polydrusus juniperi Desbrochers des Loges, 1873^{c g}
- Polydrusus kadleci Borovec & Germann, 2013^{c g}
- Polydrusus kahri Kirsch, 1865^{c g}
- Polydrusus kiesenwetteri (Faust, 1887)^{c g}
- Polydrusus korbi (Stierlin, 1888)^{c g}
- Polydrusus lateralis Gyllenhal, 1834^{c g}
- Polydrusus latitarsis Hustache, 1929^{c g}
- Polydrusus lepineyi Hustache, 1946^{c g}
- Polydrusus leucaspis Boheman, 1840^{c g}
- Polydrusus longiceps (Schilsky, 1912)^{c g}
- Polydrusus longicornis Champion, 1911^{c g}
- Polydrusus longus (Stierlin, 1884)^{c g}
- Polydrusus lopatini Meleshko & Korotyaev, 2005^{c g}
- Polydrusus lucianae Francia, 1985^{c g}
- Polydrusus luctuosus (Desbrochers des Loges, 1875)^{c g}
- Polydrusus lusitanicus (Chevrolat, 1879)^{c g}
- Polydrusus macrocephalus Champion, 1911^{c g}
- Polydrusus manteroi (Solari & Solari, 1903)^{c g}
- Polydrusus marcidus Kiesenwetter, 1864^{c g}
- Polydrusus marginatus (Stephens, 1831)^{c g}
- Polydrusus mariae (Faust, 1882)^{c g}
- Polydrusus maurus (Peyerimhoff, 1925)^{c g}
- Polydrusus mecedanus Reitter, 1908^{c g}
- Polydrusus minutus (Stierlin, 1884)^{c g}
- Polydrusus modestus (Stierlin, 1864)^{c g}
- Polydrusus mogadoricus (Escalera, 1914)^{c g}
- Polydrusus mollicomus (Peyerimhoff, 1920)^{c g}
- Polydrusus mollis (Stroem, 1768)^{c g}
- Polydrusus moricei Pic, 1903^{c g}
- Polydrusus mutabilis Champion, 1911^{c g}
- Polydrusus nadaii Meleshko & Korotyaev, 2005^{c g}
- Polydrusus neapolitanus Desbrochers des Loges, 1872^{c g}
- Polydrusus nothofagi Kuschel, 1950^{c g}
- Polydrusus obesulus Faust, 1882^{c g}
- Polydrusus obliquatus (Faust, 1884)^{c g}
- Polydrusus obrieni Korotyaev, Ismailova & Meleshko, 2003^{c g}
- Polydrusus ochreus (Fall, 1907)^{i c g b}
- Polydrusus pallidisetis Champion, 1911^{c g}
- Polydrusus pallidus (Gyllenhal, 1834)^{g}
- Polydrusus pallipes (Lucas, 1849)^{c g}
- Polydrusus paradoxus Stierlin, 1859^{c g}
- Polydrusus parallelus (Chevrolat, 1860)^{c g}
- Polydrusus partitus Champion, 1911^{c g}
- Polydrusus pauper (Stierlin, 1890)^{c g}
- Polydrusus pedemontanus (Chevrolat, 1869)^{c g}
- Polydrusus peninsularis Horn, 1894^{c g}
- Polydrusus pici Schilsky, 1910^{c g}
- Polydrusus picus (Fabricius, 1792)^{c g}
- Polydrusus piliferus Hochhuth, 1847^{c g}
- Polydrusus piligerus Stierlin, 1884^{c g}
- Polydrusus pilosulus Chevrolat, 1865^{c g}
- Polydrusus pilosus Gredler, 1866^{c g}
- Polydrusus pirazzolii Stierlin, 1857^{c g}
- Polydrusus pistaciae (Kiesenwetter, 1864)^{c g}
- Polydrusus planifrons (Gyllenhal, 1834)^{c g}
- Polydrusus ponticus Faust, 1888^{c g}
- Polydrusus prasinus Olivier, 1790
- Polydrusus privatus (Normand, 1949)^{c g}
- Polydrusus pterygomalis (Boheman, 1840)^{c g}
- Polydrusus pulchellus Stephens, 1831
- Polydrusus pyrenaeus Tempère, 1976
- Polydrusus quadraticollis (Desbrochers des Loges, 1902)^{g}
- Polydrusus raverae Solari & Solari, 1903^{c g}
- Polydrusus reitteri Stierlin, 1884^{c}
- Polydrusus rhodiacus Schilsky, 1912^{c g}
- Polydrusus roseiceps Pesarini, 1975^{c g}
- Polydrusus roseus (Blanchard, 1831)^{c g}
- Polydrusus rubicundus Pesarini, 1973^{c g}
- Polydrusus rufulus (Hochhuth, 1847)^{c g}
- Polydrusus scapularis Pesarini, 1975^{c g}
- Polydrusus schwiegeri Reitter, 1908^{c g}
- Polydrusus sciaphiliformis Apfelbeck, 1898^{c g}
- Polydrusus scutellaris (Chevrolat, 1860)^{c g}
- Polydrusus seidlitzi Schilsky, 1910^{c g}
- Polydrusus senex Chevrolat, 1866^{c g}
- Polydrusus sericeus (Schaller, 1783)^{i}
- Polydrusus setifrons (Jacquelin du Val, 1852)^{c g}
- Polydrusus sicanus Chevrolat, 1860^{c g}
- Polydrusus sichuanicus Korotyaev & Meleshko, 1997^{c g}
- Polydrusus siculus Desbrochers des Loges, 1872^{g}
- Polydrusus sirdariensis (Bajtenov, 1974)^{c g}
- Polydrusus smaragdulus (Fairmaire, 1859)
- Polydrusus solarii Pesarini, 1975^{c}
- Polydrusus sparsus Gyllenhal, 1834^{c g}
- Polydrusus spiniger (Desbrochers des Loges, 1897)^{c g}
- Polydrusus splendens F. Solari, 1909^{c g}
- Polydrusus stierlini Schilsky, 1910^{c g}
- Polydrusus subalpinus Petri, 1912^{c g}
- Polydrusus subcyaneus (Desbrochers des Loges, 1872)^{c g}
- Polydrusus subglaber (Desbrochers des Loges, 1870)^{c g}
- Polydrusus subnotatus Schilsky, 1910^{c g}
- Polydrusus talamellii Pesarini, 1999^{c g}
- Polydrusus tereticollis (De Geer, 1775)^{c g}
- Polydrusus tibialis (Gyllenhal, 1834)^{c g}
- Polydrusus tinauti Alonso-Zarazaga, 2013^{c g}
- Polydrusus tonsus (Desbrochers des Loges, 1897)^{c g}
- Polydrusus transalpinus K. Daniel & J. Daniel, 1906^{c g}
- Polydrusus transjordanus Germann, 2018^{c}
- Polydrusus tscharynensis (Bajtenov, 1971)^{c g}
- Polydrusus turanensis (Faust, 1891)^{c g}
- Polydrusus turcicus Meleshko & Korotyaev, 2003^{c g}
- Polydrusus vagepictus (Desbrochers des Loges, 1892)^{c g}
- Polydrusus variegatus Desbrochers, 1870^{g}
- Polydrusus villosithorax Apfelbeck, 1922^{c g}
- Polydrusus virbius (Reitter, 1899)^{c g}
- Polydrusus virens Kiesenwetter, 1864
- Polydrusus virginalis (Faust, 1888)^{c g}
- Polydrusus viridicinctus Gyllenhal, 1834^{c g}
- Polydrusus viridimarginalis Hustache, 1946^{c g}
- Polydrusus vodozi (Desbrochers des Loges, 1903)^{g}
- Polydrusus vulpeculus Hustache, 1946^{c g}
- Polydrusus wymanni Borovec & Germann, 2013^{c g}
- Polydrusus xanthopus Gyllenhal, 1834^{c g}
- Polydrusus yunakovi Alonso- Zarazaga, 2013^{c g}
- Polydrusus zumpti Voss, 1958^{c g}
- Polydrusus zurcheri (Schilsky, 1912)^{g}

Data sources: i = ITIS, c = Catalogue of Life, g = GBIF, b = Bugguide.net
