= List of Phyllobius species =

This is a list of 164 species in Phyllobius, a genus of broad-nosed weevils in the family Curculionidae.

== Phyllobius species ==
- Phyllobius achardi Desbrochers des Loges, 1873^{c g}
- Phyllobius aetolicus Apfelbeck, 1901^{c g}
- Phyllobius alpinus Stierlin, 1859^{c g}
- Phyllobius altaicus Gebler, 1833^{c g}
- Phyllobius alternans Bajtenov, 1974^{c g}
- Phyllobius annectens Sharp, 1896^{c g}
- Phyllobius arborator (Herbst, 1797)^{c g}
- Phyllobius argentatus Linnaeus, 1758^{c g}
- Phyllobius armatus Roelofs, 1876^{c g}
- Phyllobius armeniacus Kirsch, 1878^{c g}
- Phyllobius atlasicus Hustache, 1933^{c g}
- Phyllobius baicalicus Korotyaev, 1979^{c g}
- Phyllobius ballionis Stark, 1889^{c g}
- Phyllobius banghaasi Schilsky, 1908^{c g}
- Phyllobius betulinus Bechstein & Scharfenberg, 1805^{c g}
- Phyllobius brenskei Schilsky, 1911^{c g}
- Phyllobius brevis Gyllenhal, 1834^{c g}
- Phyllobius bulgaricus Apfelbeck, 1915^{c g}
- Phyllobius cambyses Pesarini, 1981^{c g}
- Phyllobius canus Gyllenhal, 1834^{c g}
- Phyllobius cervinus Hochhuth, 1847^{c g}
- Phyllobius cinerascens (Fabricius, 1792)^{g}
- Phyllobius circassicus Reitter, 1888^{c g}
- Phyllobius claviger Faust, 1889^{c g}
- Phyllobius confusus Schilsky, 1912^{c g}
- Phyllobius contemptus Schoenherr, 1832^{c g}
- Phyllobius crassipes Motschulsky, 1860^{c g}
- Phyllobius crassus Motschulsky, 1860^{c g}
- Phyllobius cupreoaureus Stierlin, 1861^{c g}
- Phyllobius cylindricollis Gyllenhal, 1834^{c g}
- Phyllobius dahli Korotyaev, 1984^{c g}
- Phyllobius dalabanus Voss, 1956^{c g}
- Phyllobius delagrangei Desbrochers des Loges, 1892^{c g}
- Phyllobius derjugini Smirnov, 1913^{c g}
- Phyllobius deyrollei Tournier, 1877^{c g}
- Phyllobius dispar Redtenbacher, 1849^{c g}
- Phyllobius emeryi Desbrochers des Loges, 1873^{c g}
- Phyllobius emgei Stierlin, 1887^{c g}
- Phyllobius emmrichi Bajtenov, 1980^{c g}
- Phyllobius eques Reitter, 1913^{c g}
- Phyllobius etruscus Desbrochers des Loges, 1872^{c g}
- Phyllobius euchromus Reitter, 1885^{c g}
- Phyllobius exaequatus Faust, 1885^{c g}
- Phyllobius farinosus Motschulsky, 1860^{c g}
- Phyllobius femoralis Boheman, 1842^{c g}
- Phyllobius fessus Boheman, 1843^{g}
- Phyllobius festae F. Solari, 1925^{c g}
- Phyllobius flecki Reitter, 1906^{c g}
- Phyllobius fulvago (Gyllenhal, 1834)^{c g}
- Phyllobius fulvagoides Reitter, 1885^{c g}
- Phyllobius fumigatus Boheman, 1843^{c g}
- Phyllobius ganglbaueri Apfelbeck, 1915^{c g}
- Phyllobius glaucus (Scopoli, 1763)^{i c g}
- Phyllobius globicollis Morimoto & Miyakawa, 2006^{c g}
- Phyllobius gomadanensis Morimoto & Miyakawa, 2006^{c g}
- Phyllobius granicollis Pesarini, 1970^{c g}
- Phyllobius grubovi Korotyaev, 1984^{c g}
- Phyllobius grunini Korotyaev & Egorov, 1977^{c g}
- Phyllobius haberhaueri Apfelbeck, 1915^{c g}
- Phyllobius harlachingensis Gistel, 1857^{c g}
- Phyllobius helenae Korotyaev & Egorov, 1977^{c g}
- Phyllobius hirtipennis (Hustache, 1921)^{c g}
- Phyllobius hiurai Morimoto & Miyakawa, 2006^{c g}
- Phyllobius hochhuthi Faust, 1883^{c g}
- Phyllobius ichihashii Morimoto & Miyakawa, 2006^{c g}
- Phyllobius incomptus Sharp, 1896^{c g}
- Phyllobius insidiosus Pesarini, 1981^{c g}
- Phyllobius insulanus Schilsky, 1911^{c g}
- Phyllobius intrusus Kono, 1948^{i b} (arborvitae weevil)
- Phyllobius italicus A. Solari & F. Solari, 1904^{c g}
- Phyllobius jacobsoni Smirnov, 1913^{c g}
- Phyllobius japonicus Faust, 1889^{c g}
- Phyllobius kajigamori Morimoto & Miyakawa, 2006^{c g}
- Phyllobius kantoensis Morimoto & Miyakawa, 2006^{c g}
- Phyllobius karamanensis Voss, 1964^{c g}
- Phyllobius kaszabi L. Arnoldi & Korotyaev, 1977^{c g}
- Phyllobius kerzhneri Korotyaev & Egorov, 1977^{c g}
- Phyllobius kolymensis Korotyaev & Egorov, 1977^{c g}
- Phyllobius korbi Schilsky, 1908^{c g}
- Phyllobius kozlovi Korotyaev & Egorov, 1977^{c g}
- Phyllobius kuldzhanus Suvorov, 1915^{c g}
- Phyllobius kumanoensis Morimoto & Miyakawa, 2006^{c g}
- Phyllobius kurosonensis Morimoto & Miyakawa, 2006^{c g}
- Phyllobius lateralis Reiche, 1857^{c g}
- Phyllobius lederi Schilsky, 1911^{c g}
- Phyllobius lenkoranus Schilsky, 1911^{c g}
- Phyllobius leonhardi Schilsky, 1908^{c g}
- Phyllobius leonisi Pic, 1902^{c g}
- Phyllobius lewisi (Sharp, 1896)^{c g}
- Phyllobius litoralis Faust, 1887^{c g}
- Phyllobius lodosi Pesarini, 1975^{c g}
- Phyllobius logunovi Korotyaev, 1995^{c g}
- Phyllobius longipilis Boheman, 1842^{c g}
- Phyllobius lukjanovitshi Korotyaev & Egorov, 1977^{c g}
- Phyllobius maculicornis Germar, 1824^{c g}
- Phyllobius maculosus Motschulsky, 1860^{c g}
- Phyllobius mediatus Reitter, 1888^{c g}
- Phyllobius meschniggi F. Solari, 1938^{c g}
- Phyllobius mixtus Hochhuth, 1847^{c g}
- Phyllobius mongolicus Korotyaev & Egorov, 1977^{c g}
- Phyllobius montanus Miller, 1862^{c g}
- Phyllobius nigrofasciatus Pesarini, 1974^{c g}
- Phyllobius noesskei Apfelbeck, 1915^{c g}
- Phyllobius nudiamplus Reitter, 1916^{c g}
- Phyllobius oblongus (Linnaeus, 1758)^{i c g b} (European snout beetle)
- Phyllobius obovatus Gebler, 1834^{c g}
- Phyllobius obscuripes Schilsky, 1911^{c g}
- Phyllobius occidentalis Morimoto & Miyakawa, 2006^{c g}
- Phyllobius pallidipennis Hochhuth, 1847^{c g}
- Phyllobius pallidus (Fabricius, 1792)^{c g}
- Phyllobius parcus Voss, 1956^{c g}
- Phyllobius parviceps Desbrochers des Loges, 1873^{c g}
- Phyllobius parvicollis Korotyaev & Egorov, 1977^{c g}
- Phyllobius pellitus Boheman, 1842^{c g}
- Phyllobius peneckei F. Solari, 1931^{c g}
- Phyllobius perspicillatus Pesarini, 1971^{c g}
- Phyllobius pesarinii Borovec & Magnano, 2004^{c g}
- Phyllobius picipes Motschulsky, 1861^{c g}
- Phyllobius pilicornis Desbrochers des Loges, 1873^{c g}
- Phyllobius pilidorsum Desbrochers des Loges, 1895^{c g}
- Phyllobius pilipes Desbrochers des Loges, 1872^{c g}
- Phyllobius pomaceus Gyllenhal, 1834^{c g}
- Phyllobius potanini Korotyaev, 1979^{c g}
- Phyllobius profanus Faust, 1881^{c g}
- Phyllobius prolongatus Motschulsky, 1860^{c g}
- Phyllobius przewalskii Korotyaev, 1979^{c g}
- Phyllobius pubipennis Pesarini, 1981^{c g}
- Phyllobius pyri Linnaeus, 1758^{c g}
- Phyllobius quercicola Apfelbeck, 1916^{c g}
- Phyllobius raverae A. Solari & F. Solari, 1903^{c g}
- Phyllobius reicheidius Desbrochers des Loges, 1872^{c g}
- Phyllobius rhodopensis Apfelbeck, 1898^{c g}
- Phyllobius roboretanus Gredler, 1882^{c g}
- Phyllobius rochati Pesarini, 1981^{c g}
- Phyllobius romanus Faust, 1890^{c g}
- Phyllobius roseipennis Pesarini, 1973^{c g}
- Phyllobius rotundicollis Roelofs, 1873^{c g}
- Phyllobius russicus Stierlin, 1884^{c g}
- Phyllobius sahlbergi Faust, 1890^{c g}
- Phyllobius sauricus Korotyaev & Egorov, 1977^{c g}
- Phyllobius schatzmayri Pesarini, 1981^{c g}
- Phyllobius scutellaris Redtenbacher, 1849^{g}
- Phyllobius seladonius Brullé, 1832^{c g}
- Phyllobius shigematsui Morimoto & Miyakawa, 2006^{c g}
- Phyllobius solarii Schilsky, 1911^{c g}
- Phyllobius solskyi Faust, 1885^{c g}
- Phyllobius squamosus C.N.F. Brisout de Barneville, 1866^{c g}
- Phyllobius subdentatus Boheman, 1842^{c g}
- Phyllobius subnudus Kôno, 1928^{c g}
- Phyllobius thalassinus Gyllenhal, 1834^{c g}
- Phyllobius transsylvanicus Stierlin, 1894^{c g}
- Phyllobius tridentinus Stierlin, 1894^{c g}
- Phyllobius tuberculifer Chevrolat, 1866^{c g}
- Phyllobius tuvensis Korotyaev & Egorov, 1977^{c g}
- Phyllobius valonensis Apfelbeck, 1915^{c g}
- Phyllobius verae Korotyaev, 1984^{c g}
- Phyllobius versipellis Apfelbeck, 1915^{c g}
- Phyllobius vespertinus (Fabricius, 1792)^{c g}
- Phyllobius virens Faust, 1890^{c g}
- Phyllobius virideaeris (Laicharting, 1781)^{c g}
- Phyllobius viridicollis (Fabricius, 1792)^{c g}
- Phyllobius wittmeri Pesarini, 1971^{c g}
- Phyllobius xanthocnemus Kiesenwetter, 1852^{c g}
- Phyllobius zherichini Korotyaev & Egorov, 1977^{c g}

Data sources: i = ITIS, c = Catalogue of Life, g = GBIF, b = Bugguide.net
