= Aphrastus unicolor =

Scientific classification
- Domain: Eukaryota
- Kingdom: Animalia
- Phylum: Arthropoda
- Class: Insecta
- Order: Coleoptera
- Suborder: Polyphaga
- Infraorder: Cucujiformia
- Family: Curculionidae
- Subfamily: Entiminae
- Tribe: Phyllobiini
- Genus: Aphrastus
- Species: A. unicolor

Binomial name
- Aphrastus unicolor Horn, G.H., 1876

Species of beetle

Aphrastus unicolor is a species in the family Curculionidae ("snout and bark beetles"), in the order Coleoptera ("beetles"). It is found in North America.
