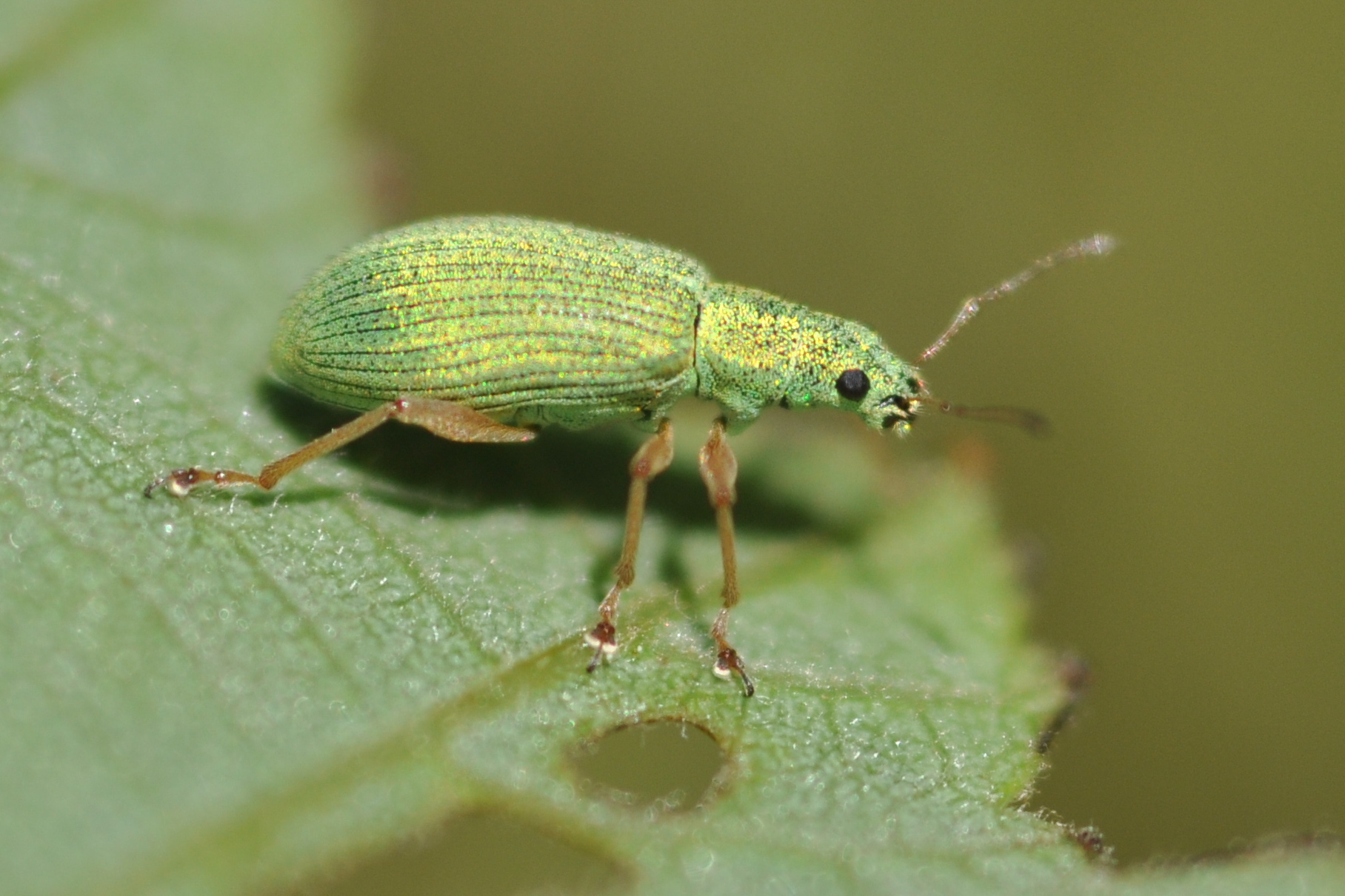

Scientific classification
- Kingdom: Animalia
- Phylum: Arthropoda
- Class: Insecta
- Order: Coleoptera
- Suborder: Polyphaga
- Infraorder: Cucujiformia
- Family: Curculionidae
- Genus: Polydrusus
- Species: P. impressifrons

Binomial name
- Polydrusus impressifrons (Gyllenhal, 1834)

= Polydrusus impressifrons =

Species of beetle

Polydrusus impressifrons, known generally as the pale green weevil or leaf weevil, is a species of broad-nosed weevil in the beetle family Curculionidae. It is native to Europe, but was introduced to North America in the early 20th Century. They feed on fruit trees and hardwood trees.

== Description ==
Polydrusus impressifrons looks similar to Polydrusus formosus, but P. impressifrons is smaller, lighter and has a broader head. Adult beetles are pale green-blue in color and have a pattern of lines and dots on their backs. They reach a length of 0.15–0.22 inches (3.8–5.6 mm).

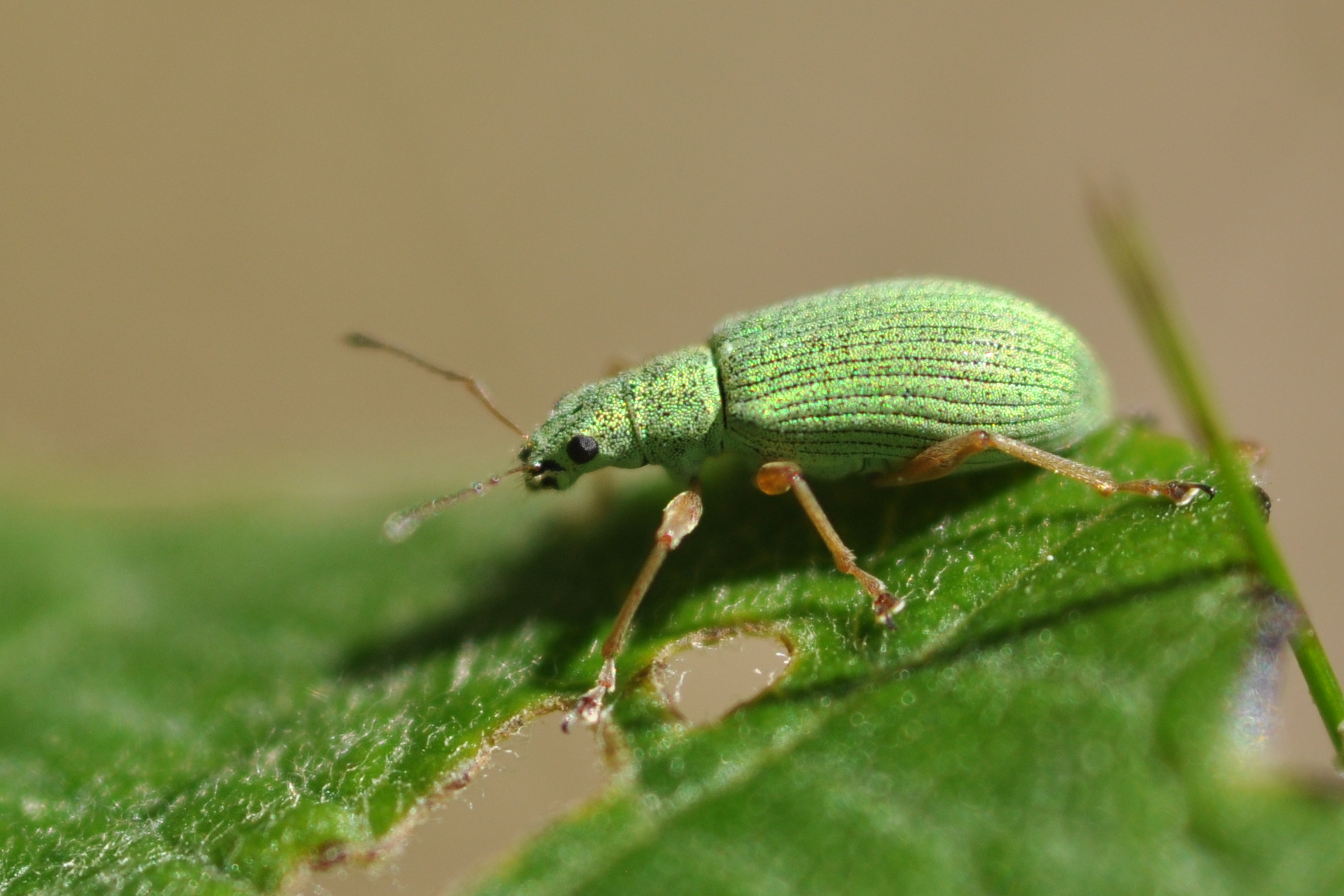
Pale green weevil, Polydrusus impressifrons

== Subspecies ==
These two subspecies belong to the species Polydrusus impressifrons:

- Polydrusus impressifrons danieli (Hoffmann, 1959)
- Polydrusus impressifrons impressifrons
