= Polydrusus ochreus =

Scientific classification
- Domain: Eukaryota
- Kingdom: Animalia
- Phylum: Arthropoda
- Class: Insecta
- Order: Coleoptera
- Suborder: Polyphaga
- Infraorder: Cucujiformia
- Family: Curculionidae
- Genus: Polydrusus
- Species: P. ochreus

Binomial name
- Polydrusus ochreus (Fall, 1907)

Species of beetle

Polydrusus ochreus is a species of broad-nosed weevil in the beetle family Curculionidae. It is found in North America.
