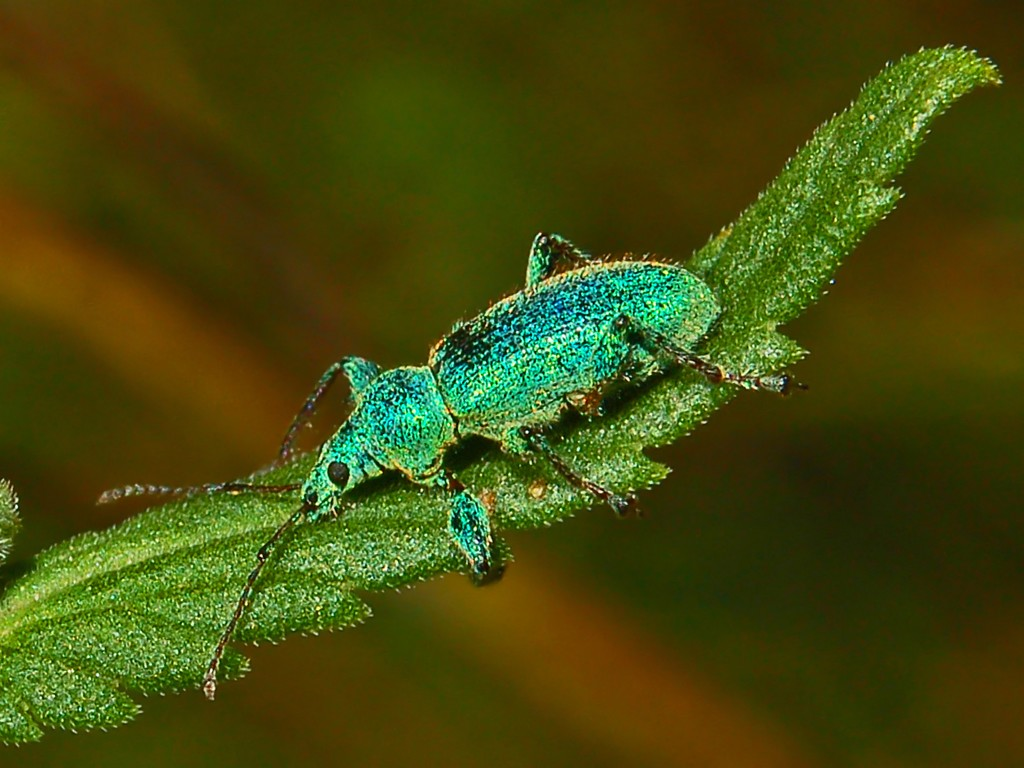
- Phyllobius arborator, July 2007, Pragelato, Torino, Italy

Scientific classification
- Domain: Eukaryota
- Kingdom: Animalia
- Phylum: Arthropoda
- Class: Insecta
- Order: Coleoptera
- Suborder: Polyphaga
- Infraorder: Cucujiformia
- Family: Curculionidae
- Subfamily: Entiminae
- Tribe: Phyllobiini; Schoenherr, 1826

Genera
- See text

= Phyllobiini =

Tribe of beetles

Phyllobiini is a weevil tribe in the subfamily Entiminae.

== Genera ==
Amphorygma – Aphrastus – Argoptochus – Brachymerinthus – Brachymiscus – Brachyxystus – Catorygma – Dichorrhinus – Drepanoderes – Epherina – Epitosus – Euphyllobiomorphus – Evopes – Evotus – Henschia – Hormotrophus – Idaspora – Metacinops – Nonnotus – Oarius – Oedecnemidius – Opitomorphus – Parascythopus – Pectonyx – Phlyda – Phyllobioides – Phyllobius – Proxyrodes – Pseudomyllocerus – Pseudosystates – Rhinoscythropus – Rhinospathe – Titinia
