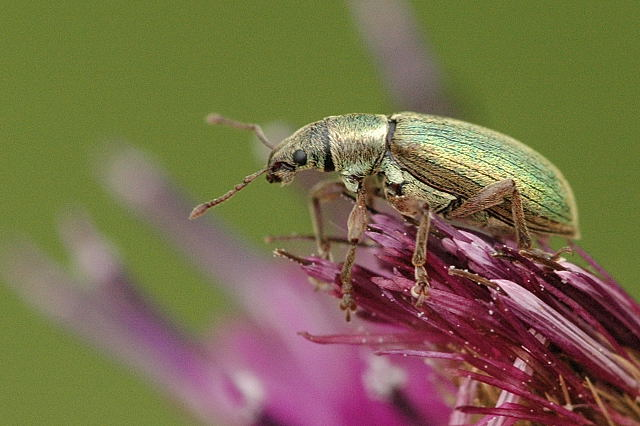
- Polydrusus pterygomalis

Scientific classification
- Kingdom: Animalia
- Phylum: Arthropoda
- Clade: Pancrustacea
- Class: Insecta
- Order: Coleoptera
- Suborder: Polyphaga
- Infraorder: Cucujiformia
- Superfamily: Curculionoidea
- Family: Curculionidae
- Genus: Polydrusus
- Species: P. pterygomalis

Binomial name
- Polydrusus pterygomalis Boheman, 1840

= Polydrusus pterygomalis =

Species of beetle

Polydrusus pterygomalis is a species of weevil native to Europe.
