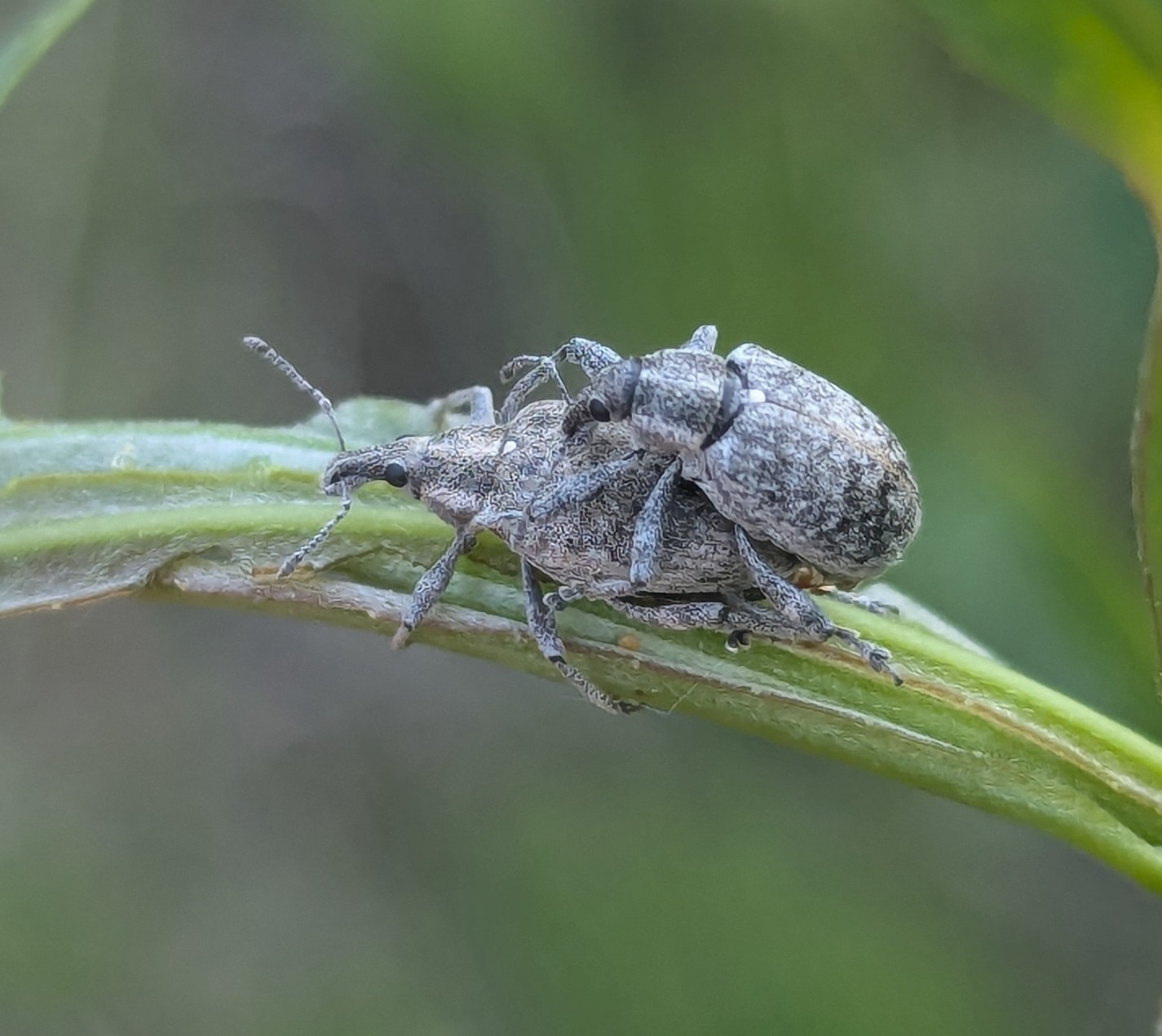
- Evotus naso in Edmonton, Canada

Scientific classification
- Kingdom: Animalia
- Phylum: Arthropoda
- Class: Insecta
- Order: Coleoptera
- Suborder: Polyphaga
- Infraorder: Cucujiformia
- Family: Curculionidae
- Tribe: Phyllobiini
- Genus: Evotus; LeConte, 1874

= Evotus =

Genus of beetles

Evotus is a genus of broad-nosed weevils in the beetle family Curculionidae. There is at least one described species in Evotus, E. naso.
