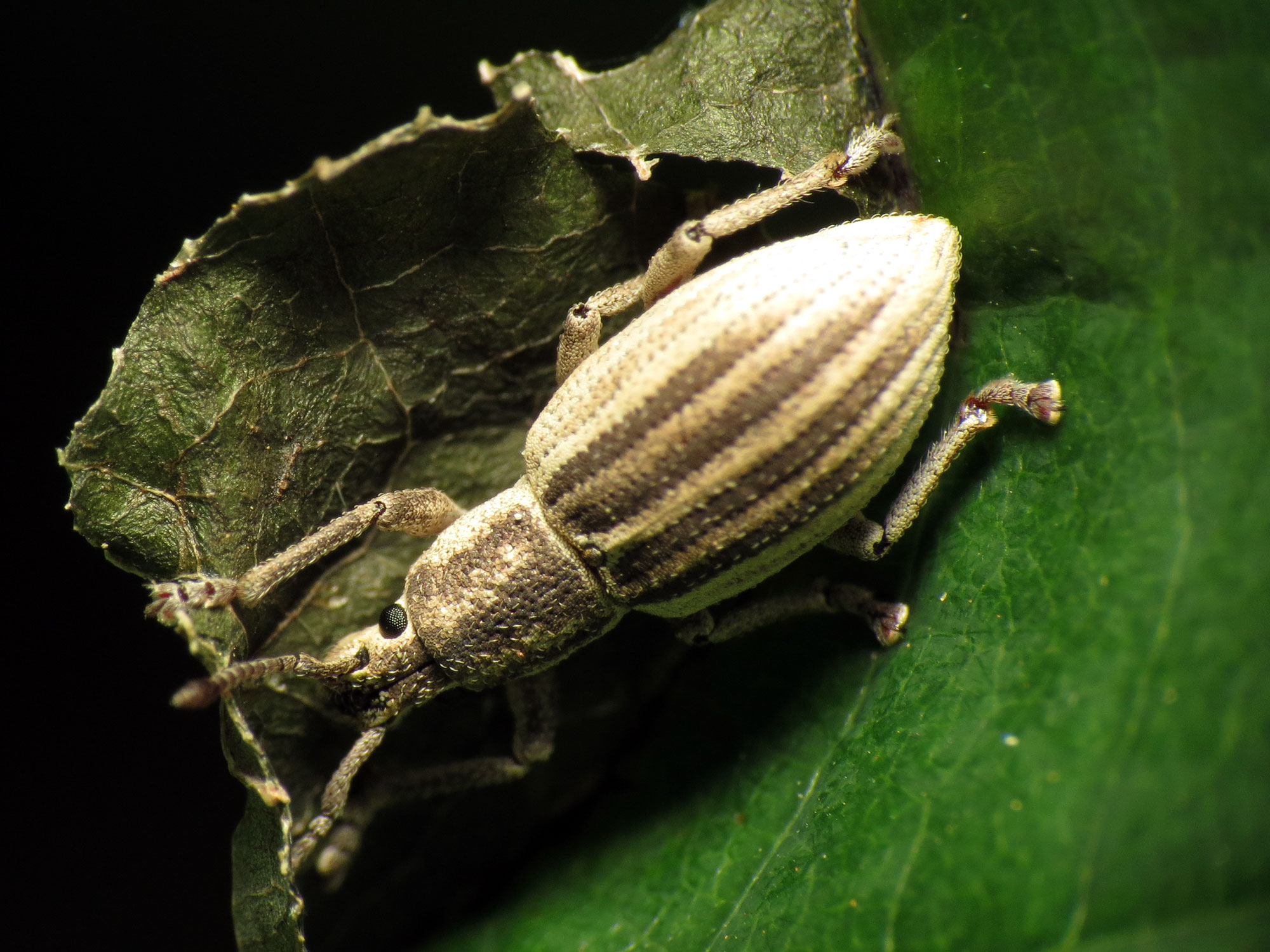
- Aphrastus taeniatus

Scientific classification
- Kingdom: Animalia
- Phylum: Arthropoda
- Clade: Pancrustacea
- Class: Insecta
- Order: Coleoptera
- Suborder: Polyphaga
- Infraorder: Cucujiformia
- Superfamily: Curculionoidea
- Family: Curculionidae
- Subfamily: Entiminae
- Tribe: Phyllobiini
- Genus: Aphrastus

Synonyms
- Aphrastus Schoenherr, 1833; Micronychus Provancher, 1877

= Aphrastus =

Genus of beetles

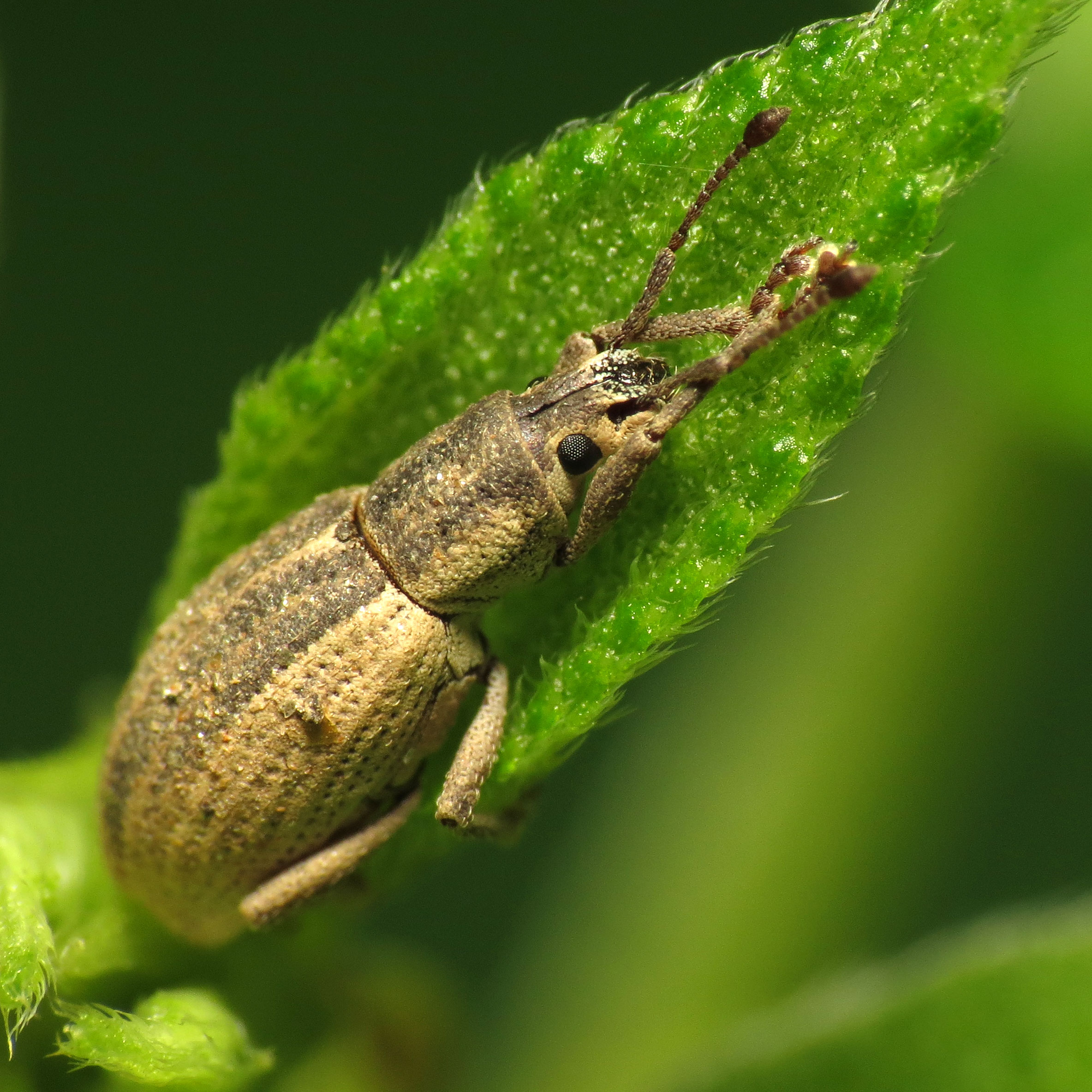
Aphrastus taeniatus

Aphrastus is a genus of broad-nosed weevils in the family Curculionidae. There are about 5 described species in Aphrastus, found in North America and Mexico.

== Species ==
These five species belong to the genus Aphrastus:

- Aphrastus angularis Champion, 1911
- Aphrastus griseus (Blatchley, 1916)
- Aphrastus submarginatus (Champion, 1911)
- Aphrastus taeniatus Say, 1831
- Aphrastus unicolor Horn, 1876
