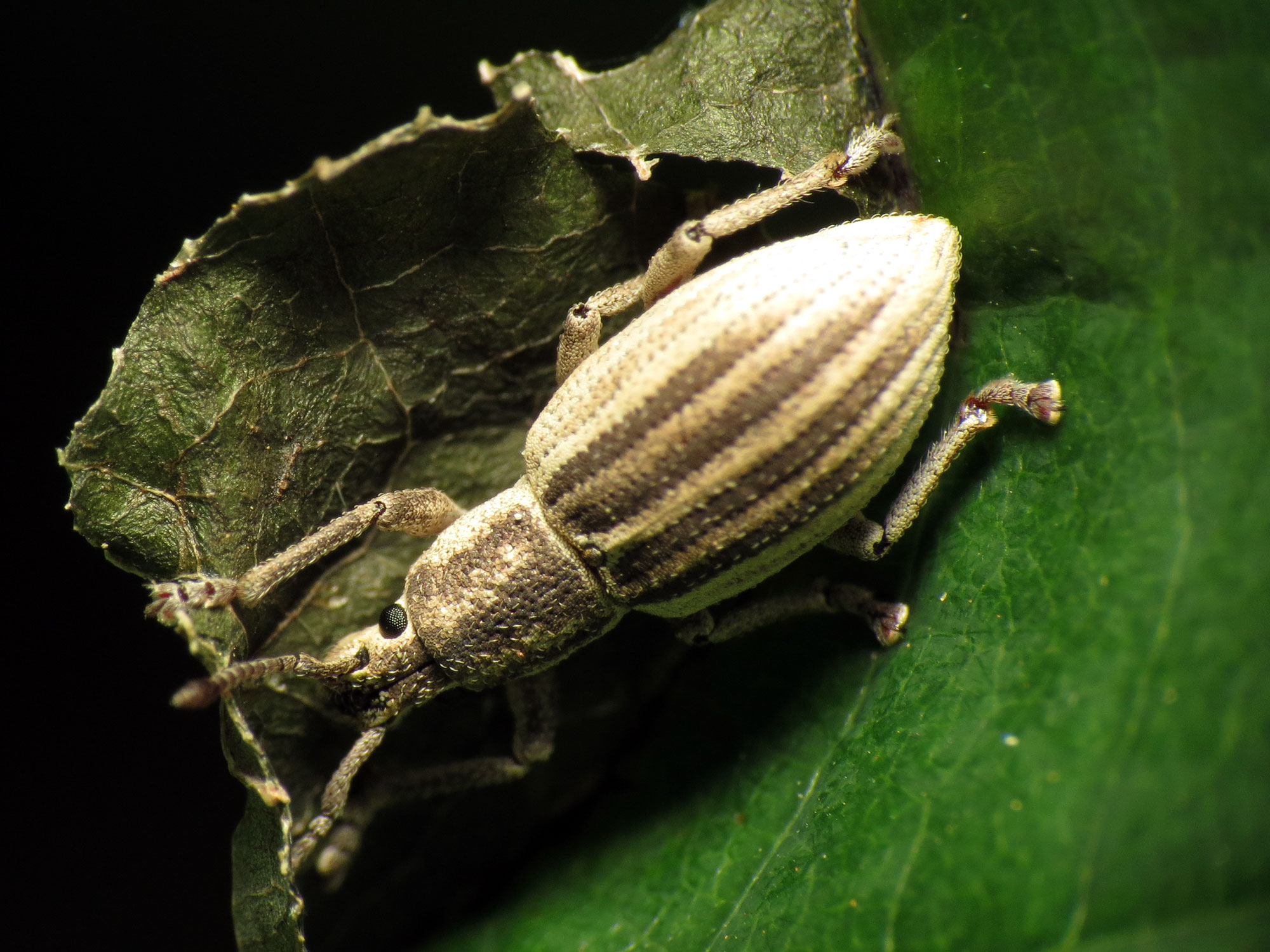

Scientific classification
- Domain: Eukaryota
- Kingdom: Animalia
- Phylum: Arthropoda
- Class: Insecta
- Order: Coleoptera
- Suborder: Polyphaga
- Infraorder: Cucujiformia
- Family: Curculionidae
- Genus: Aphrastus
- Species: A. taeniatus

Binomial name
- Aphrastus taeniatus Say, 1831

Synonyms
- Micronychus sulcatus Provancher, 1877

= Aphrastus taeniatus =

Species of beetle

Aphrastus taeniatus is a species of broad-nosed weevil in the beetle family Curculionidae. It is found in North America.

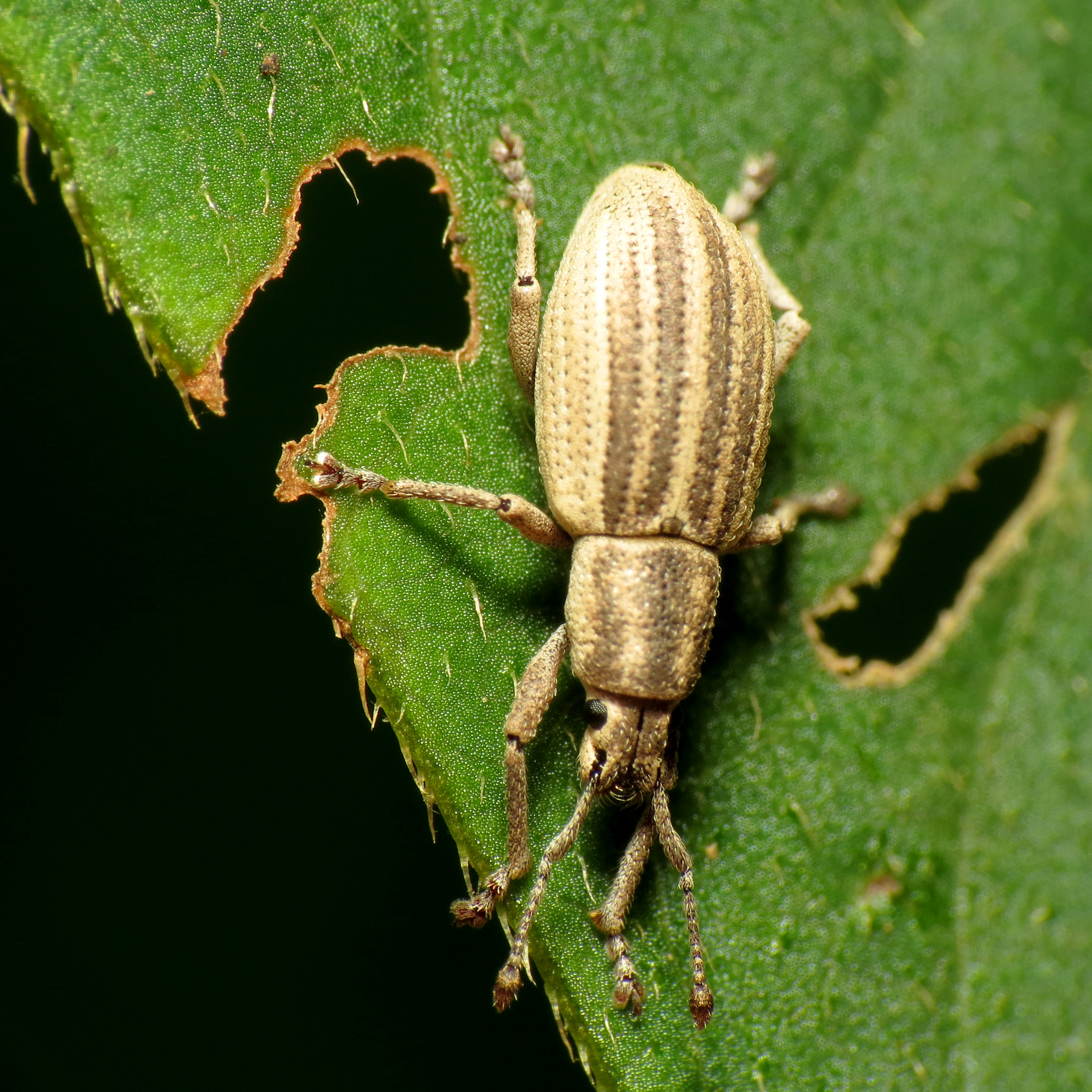

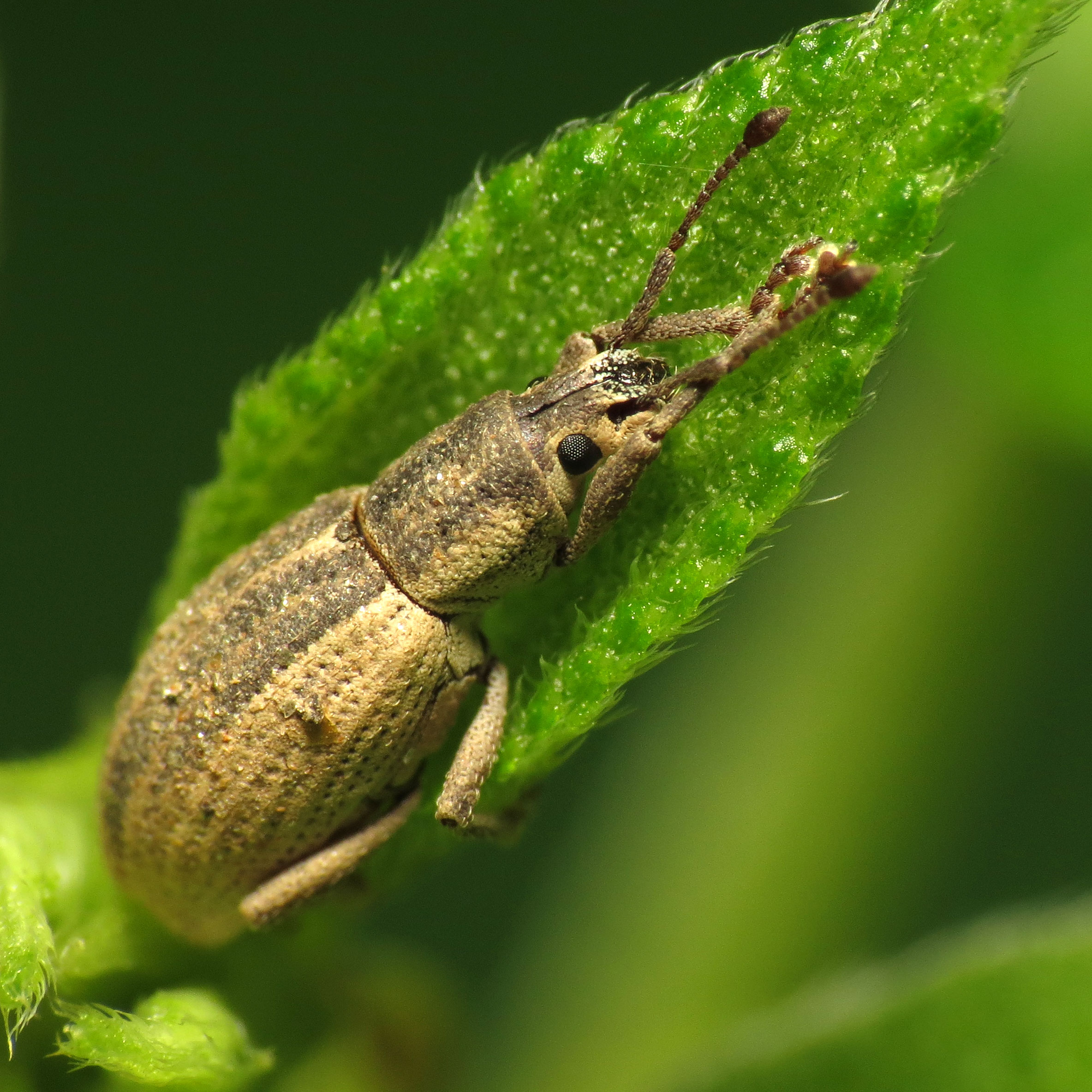
