= Polydrusus americanus =

Scientific classification
- Kingdom: Animalia
- Phylum: Arthropoda
- Class: Insecta
- Order: Coleoptera
- Suborder: Polyphaga
- Infraorder: Cucujiformia
- Family: Curculionidae
- Genus: Polydrusus
- Species: P. americanus

Binomial name
- Polydrusus americanus (Gyllenhal, 1834)

Synonyms
- Cyphomimus dorsalis Horn, 1876

Species of beetle

Polydrusus americanus is a species of broad-nosed weevil in the beetle family Curculionidae. It is found in North America.
