= Phyllobius intrusus =

Scientific classification
- Domain: Eukaryota
- Kingdom: Animalia
- Phylum: Arthropoda
- Class: Insecta
- Order: Coleoptera
- Suborder: Polyphaga
- Infraorder: Cucujiformia
- Family: Curculionidae
- Genus: Phyllobius
- Species: P. intrusus

Binomial name
- Phyllobius intrusus Kono, 1948

Species of beetle

Phyllobius intrusus, the arborvitae weevil, is a species of broad-nosed weevil in the beetle family Curculionidae. It is found in North America.
