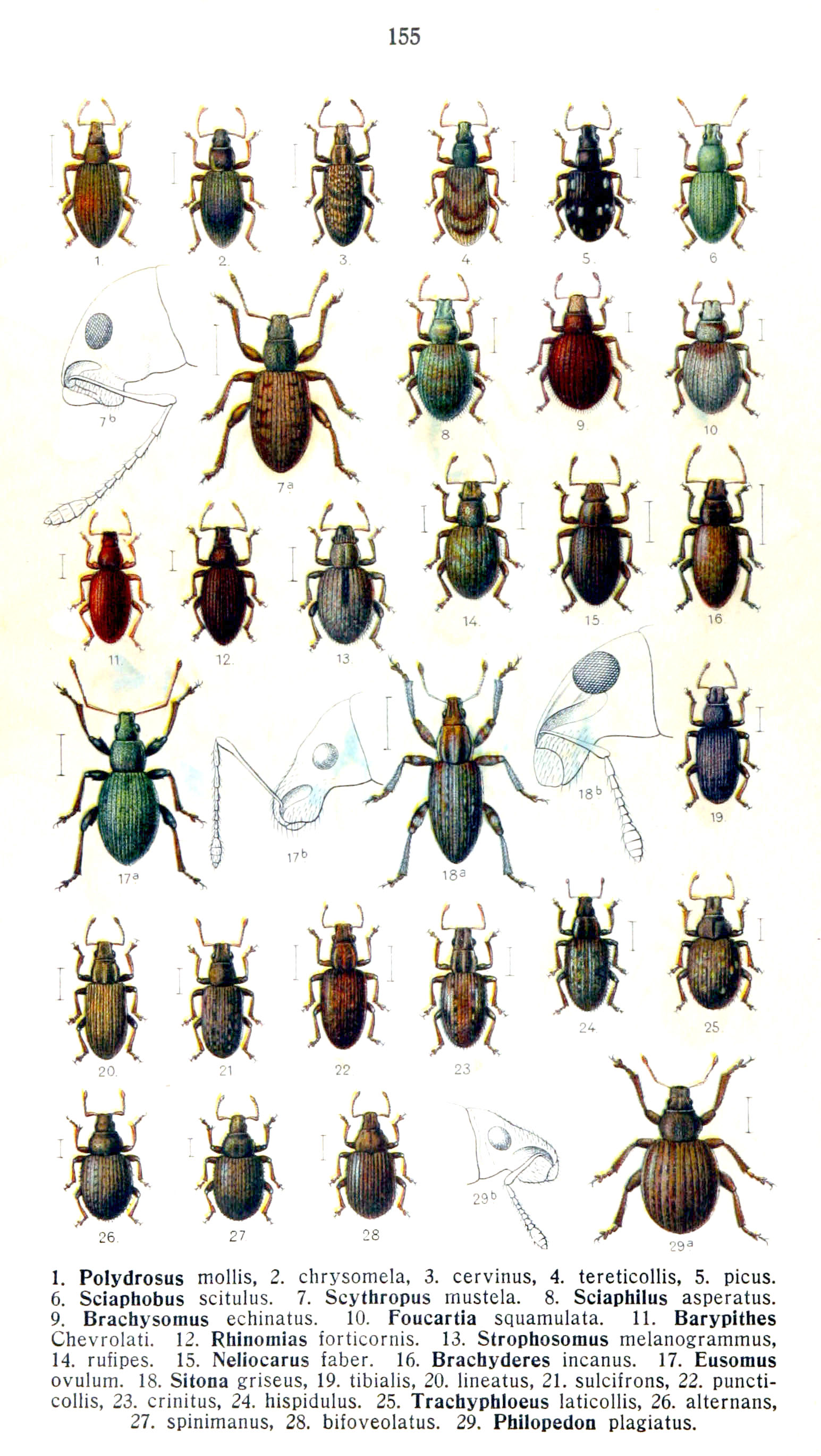

Scientific classification
- Kingdom: Animalia
- Phylum: Arthropoda
- Class: Insecta
- Order: Coleoptera
- Suborder: Polyphaga
- Infraorder: Cucujiformia
- Family: Curculionidae
- Genus: Polydrusus
- Species: P. cervinus

Binomial name
- Polydrusus cervinus (Linnaeus, 1758)

= Polydrusus cervinus =

Species of beetle

Polydrusus cervinus is a species of weevil native to Europe.
