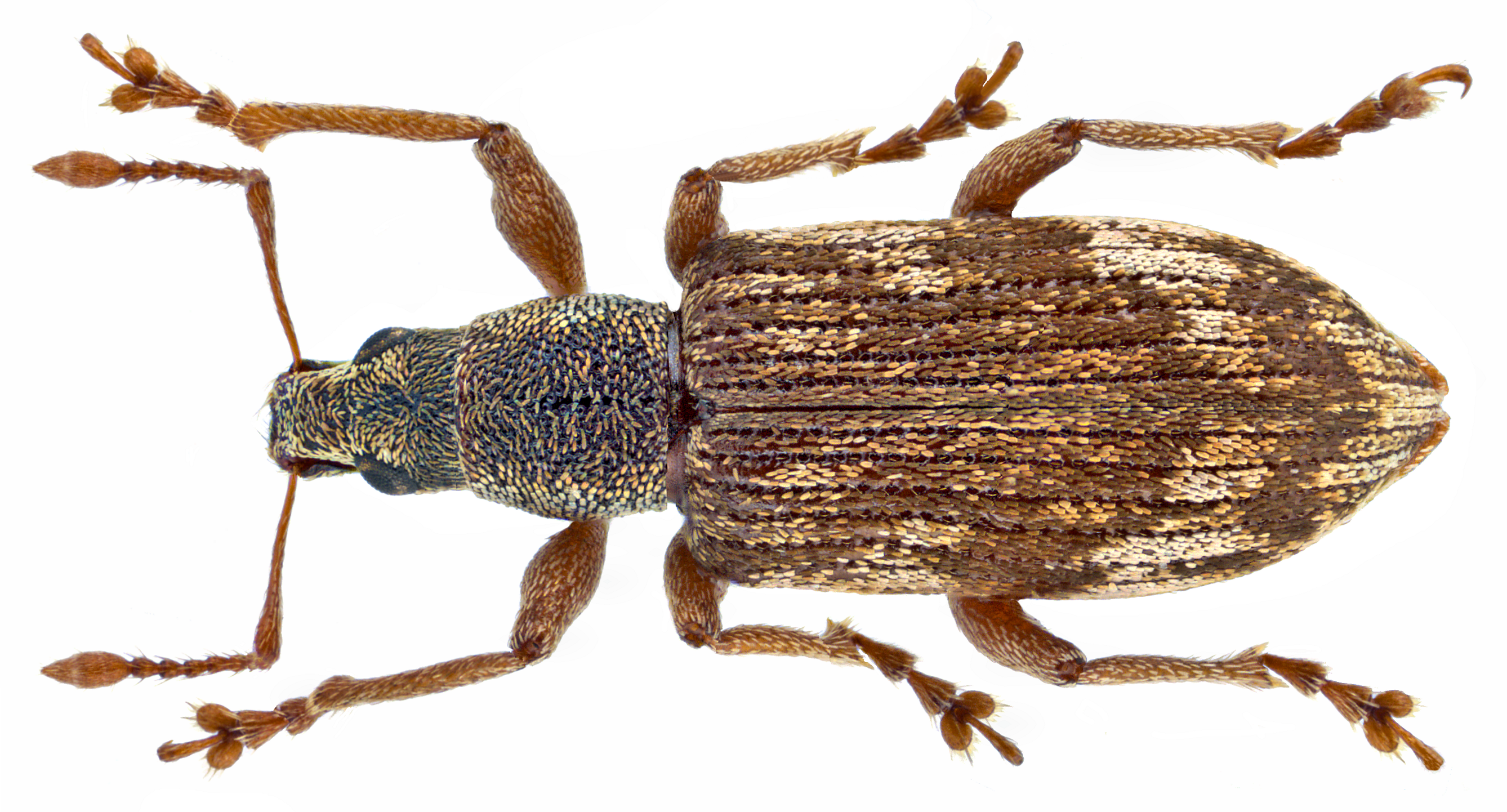
- Polydrusus tereticollis

Scientific classification
- Domain: Eukaryota
- Kingdom: Animalia
- Phylum: Arthropoda
- Class: Insecta
- Order: Coleoptera
- Suborder: Polyphaga
- Infraorder: Cucujiformia
- Family: Curculionidae
- Genus: Polydrusus
- Species: P. tereticollis

Binomial name
- Polydrusus tereticollis (DeGeer, 1775)

= Polydrusus tereticollis =

Species of beetle

Polydrusus tereticollis is a species of weevil native to Europe.
