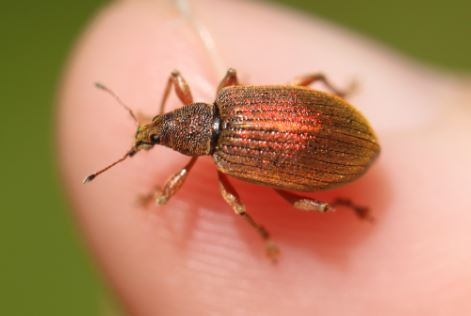

Scientific classification
- Domain: Eukaryota
- Kingdom: Animalia
- Phylum: Arthropoda
- Class: Insecta
- Order: Coleoptera
- Suborder: Polyphaga
- Infraorder: Cucujiformia
- Family: Curculionidae
- Genus: Polydrusus
- Species: P. mollis

Binomial name
- Polydrusus mollis (Ström, 1768)

= Polydrusus mollis =

Species of beetle

Polydrusus mollis is a species of weevil native to Europe.
