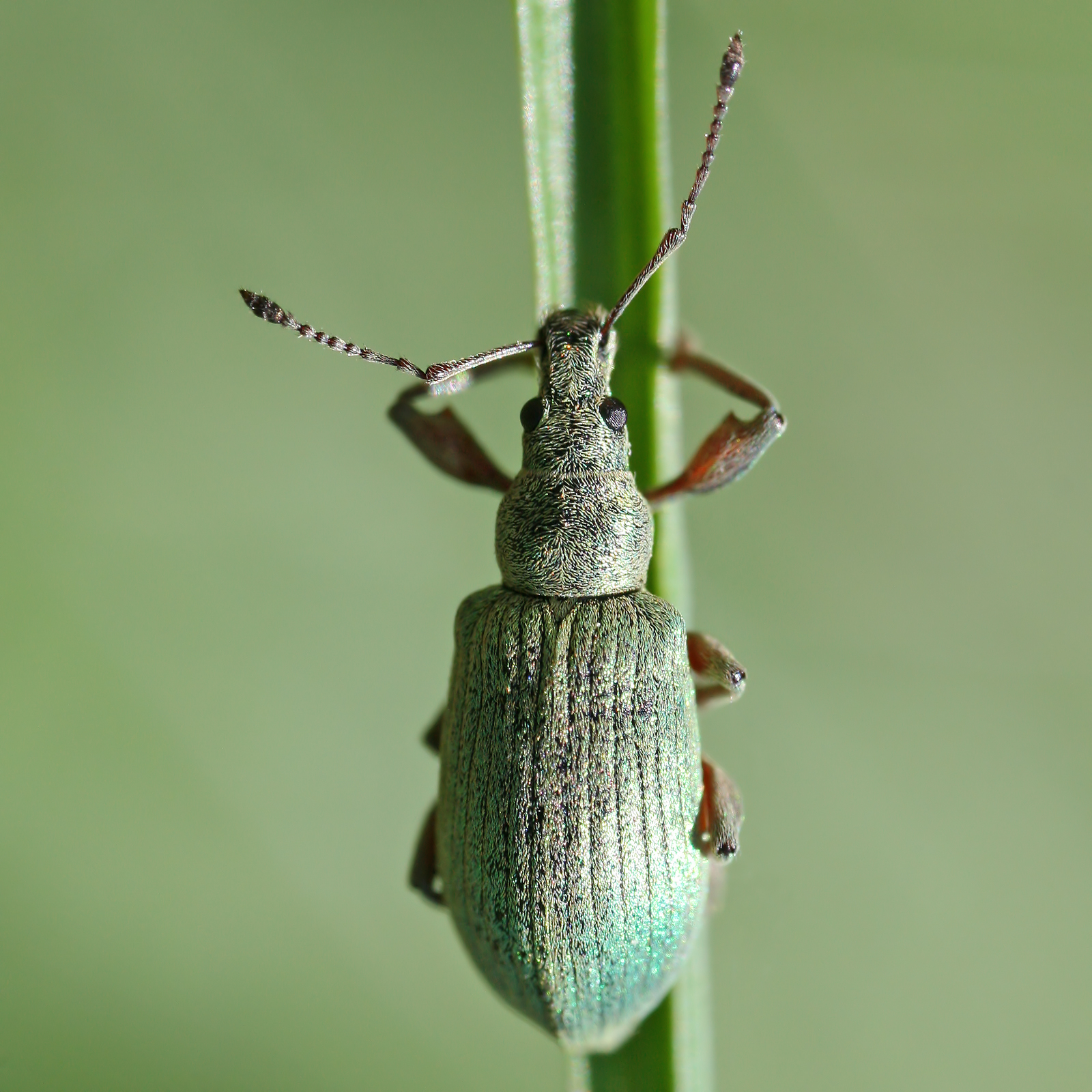

Scientific classification
- Domain: Eukaryota
- Kingdom: Animalia
- Phylum: Arthropoda
- Class: Insecta
- Order: Coleoptera
- Suborder: Polyphaga
- Infraorder: Cucujiformia
- Family: Curculionidae
- Genus: Phyllobius
- Species: P. glaucus

Binomial name
- Phyllobius glaucus (Scopoli, 1763)

= Phyllobius glaucus =

Species of beetle

Phyllobius glaucus is a species of weevil found across Europe, especially in carrs. It is a pest of a variety of fruit trees, but has little economic effect. It was first described by Giovanni Antonio Scopoli in 1763.

== Description ==
Adults grow to 8–12 millimetres (0.3–0.5 in) long. The body is black, but is covered with elongate, hair-like scales that give the animal a very variable, greenish-brown appearance. The legs are reddish brown.

== Distribution ==
Phyllobius glaucus is common and widespread in Europe. A single specimen of P. glaucus (under the name P. calcaratus) has been recorded from Canada, but this is thought to be an error.

== Ecology and life cycle ==
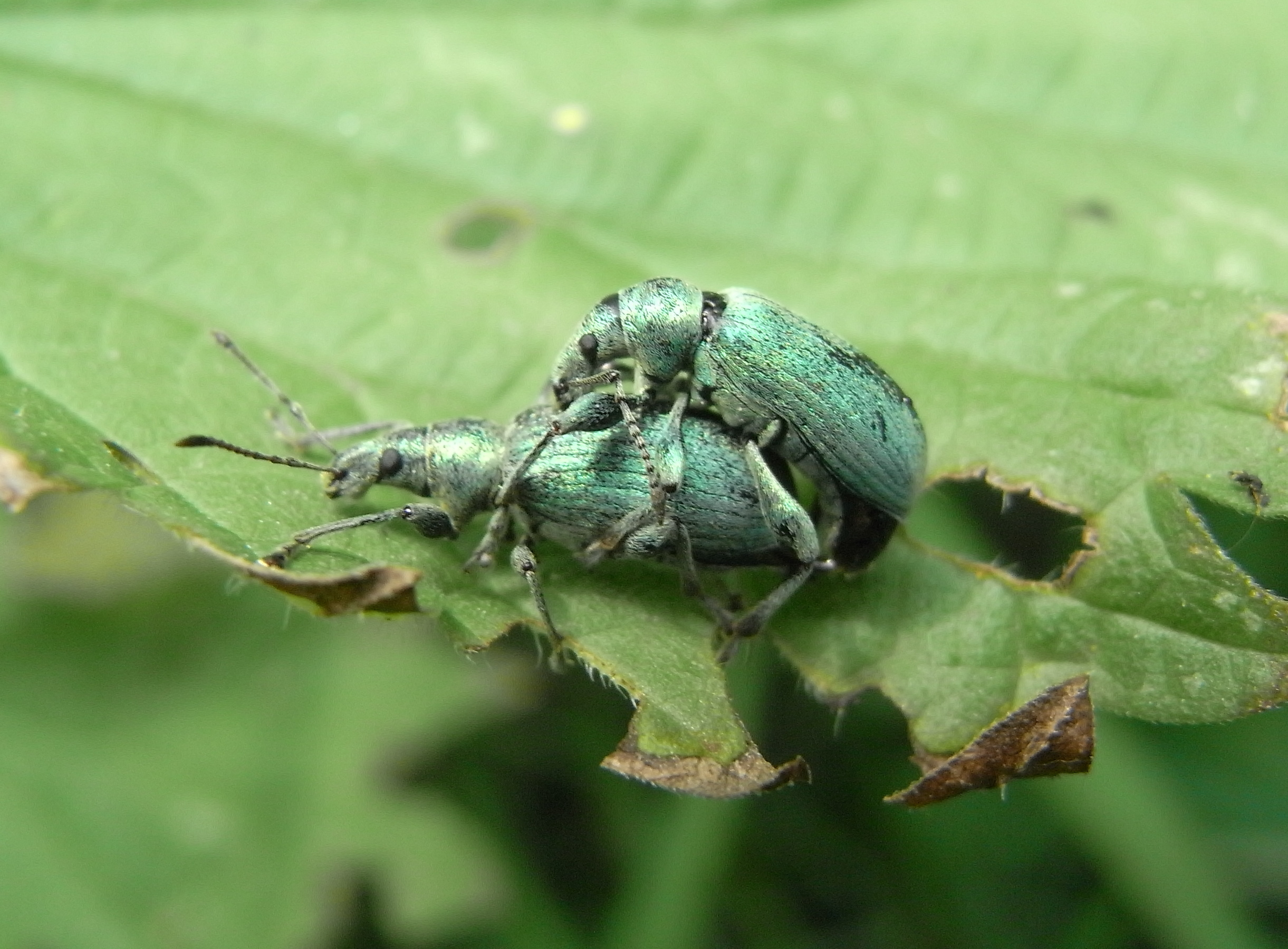
A mating pair of P. glaucus

Phyllobius glaucus is associated with a wide range of trees and shrubs, and is a minor pest of fruit trees, including apples, pears, cherries and plums. The insects chew small holes in the leaves and petals of the trees. It is a typical component of the fauna of alder carr in northwestern Europe.

== Taxonomic history ==
Phyllobius glaucus was first described by Giovanni Antonio Scopoli in his 1763 work Entomologia Carniolica, under the name Curculio glaucus. A second species was later named Curculio glaucus, but has since been renamed to Coniocleonus glaucus. Taxonomic synonyms of Phyllobius glaucus include:

- Curculio glaucus Scopoli, 1763
- Curculio coelestinus Scopoli, 1763
- Curculio carniolicus Gmelin, 1790
- Curculio calcaratus Fabricius, 1792
- Phyllobius calcaratus (Fabricius, 1792)
- Curculio caesius Marsham, 1802
- Curculio cnides Marsham, 1802
- Phyllobius atrovirens Gyllenhal, 1834
- Phyllobius alneti C. G. Thomson, 1859
- Phyllobius maculatus Tournier, 1877
- Phyllobius nudus Westhoff, 1882
- Phyllobius densatus Schilsky, 1886
- Phyllobius schilskyi Faust, 1890
- Phyllobius nigripes Gerhardt, 1900
- Phyllobius nigrofemoratus Gabriel, 1900
- Phyllobius fuscofumosus Reitter, 1906
- Phyllobius tibialis Schilsky, 1908
- Phyllobius pseudodensatus Reitter, 1916
