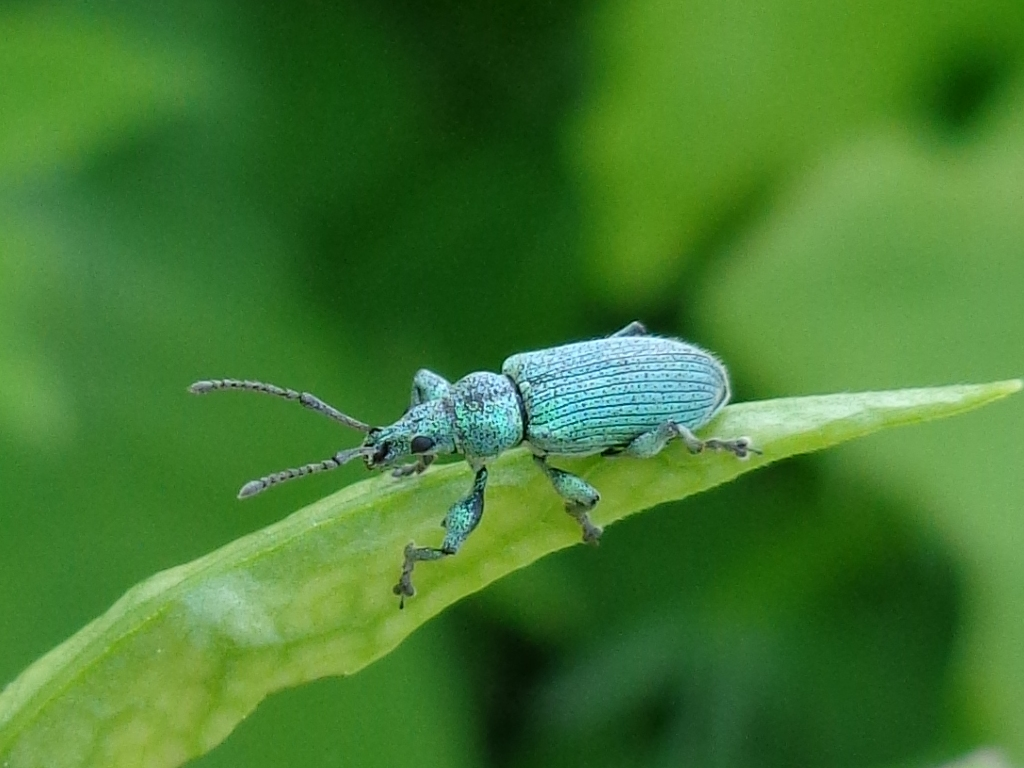

Scientific classification
- Kingdom: Animalia
- Phylum: Arthropoda
- Class: Insecta
- Order: Coleoptera
- Suborder: Polyphaga
- Infraorder: Cucujiformia
- Family: Curculionidae
- Genus: Phyllobius
- Species: P. pomaceus

Binomial name
- Phyllobius pomaceus Gyllenhal, 1834

Synonyms
- Curculio auratus Geoffroy, 1785; Curculio prasinus Olivier, 1791; Curculio urticae De Geer, 1775

= Phyllobius pomaceus =

Species of beetle

Phyllobius pomaceus (subgenus Metaphyllobius) is a species of short-nosed weevil commonly known as the nettle weevil.

== Description ==
Phyllobius pomaceus is a slender and elongate weevil, measuring 7–9 mm in length with bright metallic green scales, combined with variations of gold, blue and copper colour, on its elytra. Larvae measure up to 8 mm in length, with a creamy white coloured body and dark head.

== Habitat and distribution ==
The beetle is associated with nettles (Urtica dioica) and Meadow Sweet (Filipendula ulmaria). P. pomaceus can also be a pest of strawberries.

Larvae live within the soil feeding on roots, adults above ground on the leaves and stems of their host plants.
