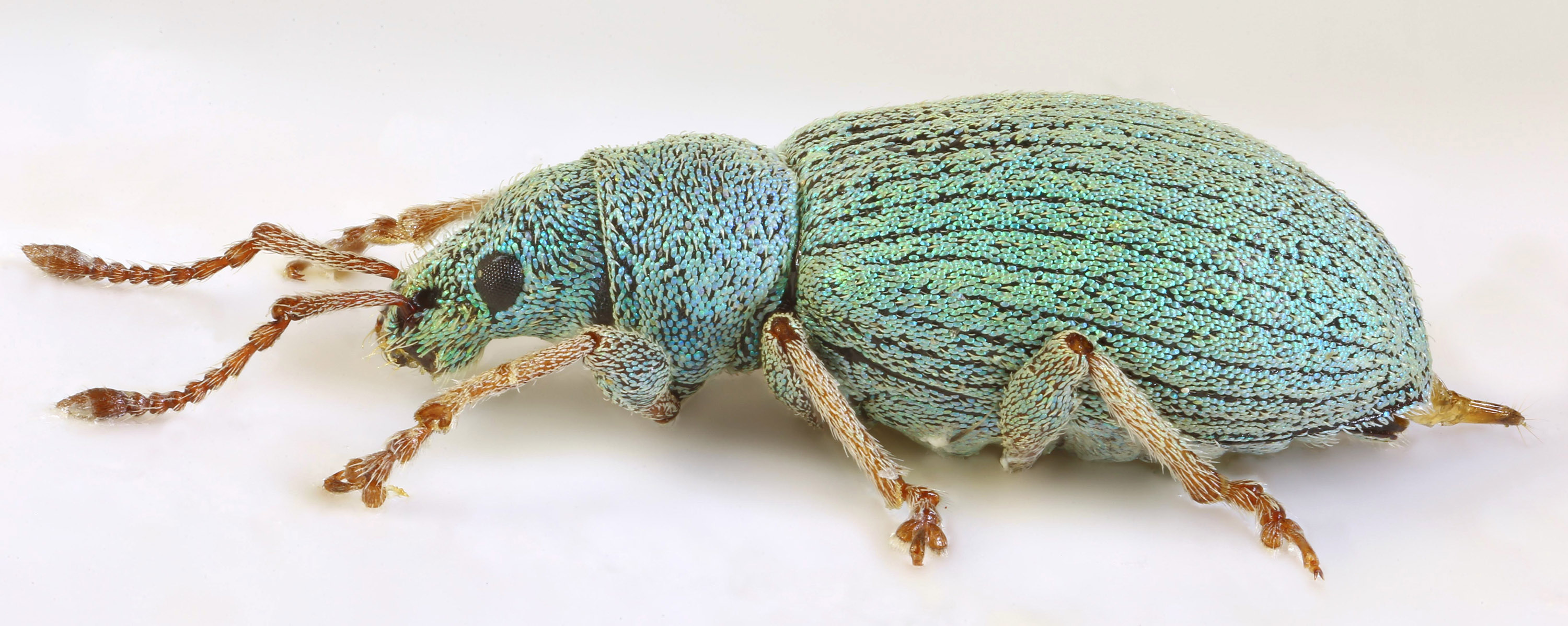
- Phyllobius viridiaeris Tywyn Gwyn dunes, North Wales

Scientific classification
- Kingdom: Animalia
- Phylum: Arthropoda
- Clade: Pancrustacea
- Class: Insecta
- Order: Coleoptera
- Suborder: Polyphaga
- Infraorder: Cucujiformia
- Superfamily: Curculionoidea
- Family: Curculionidae
- Genus: Phyllobius
- Species: P. viridiaeris

Binomial name
- Phyllobius viridiaeris (Laicharting, 1781)

= Phyllobius virideaeris =

Species of beetle

Phyllobius viridiaeris is a species of weevil native to Europe.
