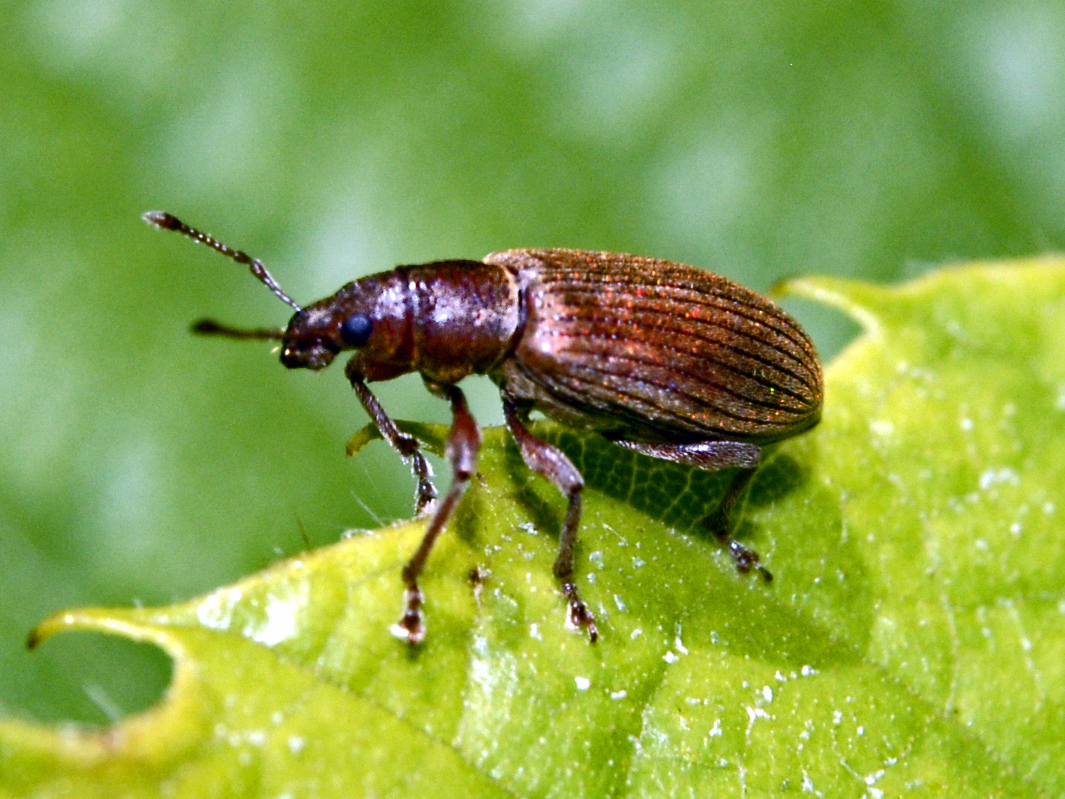
- Polydrusus impar. Lateral view
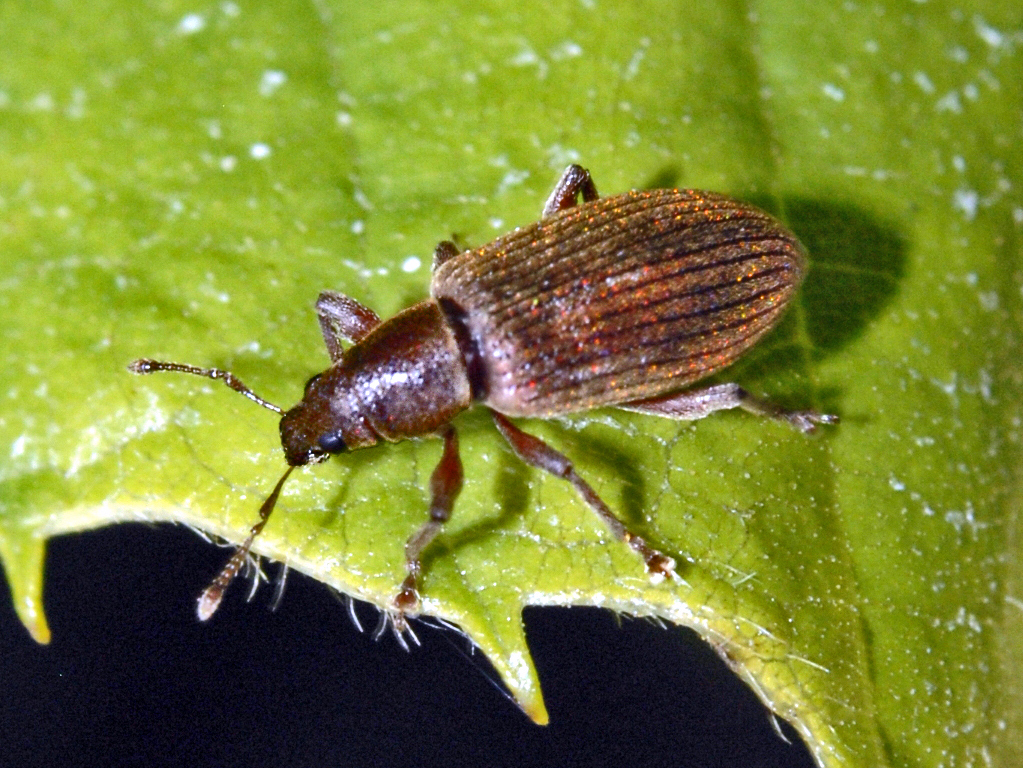
- Dorsal view

Scientific classification
- Kingdom: Animalia
- Phylum: Arthropoda
- Clade: Pancrustacea
- Class: Insecta
- Order: Coleoptera
- Suborder: Polyphaga
- Infraorder: Cucujiformia
- Family: Curculionidae
- Genus: Polydrusus
- Subgenus: Metallites
- Species: P. impar

Binomial name
- Polydrusus impar Des Gozis, 1882

Synonyms
- Metallites impar; Metallites mollis Germar, 1824; Polydrosus impar var. rubens Stierlin, 1890; Polydrusus vranicensis Reitter, 1905

= Polydrusus impar =

Species of beetle

Polydrusus impar is a species of weevils belonging to the family Curculionidae.

== Subspecies ==
- Polydrusus impar impar Gozis, 1882
- Polydrusus impar vranicensis Reitter, 1905

== Description ==
Polydrusus impar can reach a length of about 6.2–8 millimetres (0.24–0.31 in). The elytra are covered with elongated, lanceolate scales. They have a yellowish-brown or green color with metallic luster. The larvae live in the roots of trees. Adults can be found from May to September. These beetles are oligophagous.

== Distribution ==
This species is present in Austria, Bosnia and Herzegovina, Czech Republic, France, Germany, Italy, Slovakia and Switzerland.

== Habitat ==
Polydrusus impar prefers mountainous regions.
