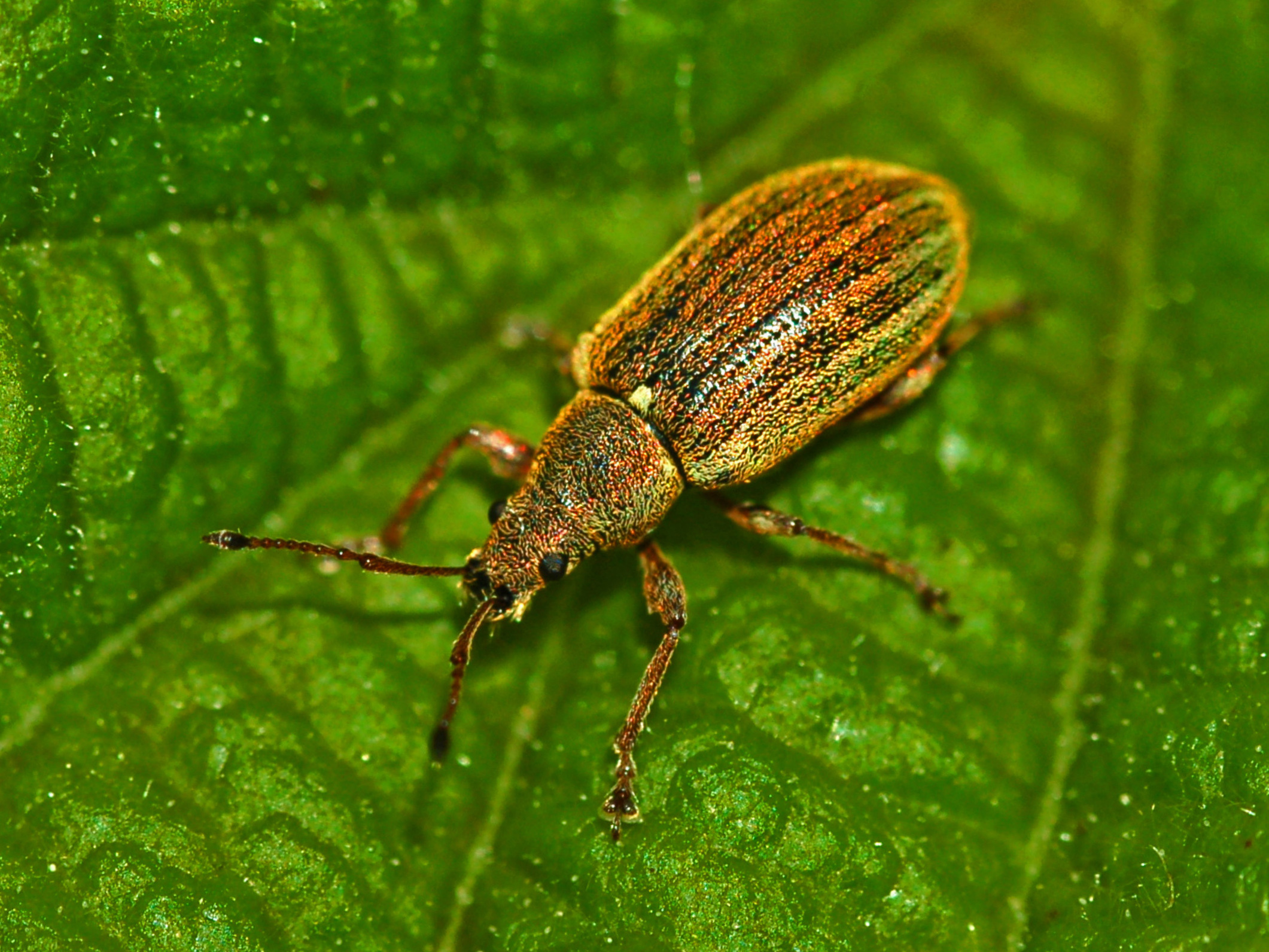
- Adult of Phyllobius pyri

Scientific classification
- Kingdom: Animalia
- Phylum: Arthropoda
- Class: Insecta
- Order: Coleoptera
- Suborder: Polyphaga
- Infraorder: Cucujiformia
- Family: Curculionidae
- Genus: Phyllobius
- Species: P. pyri

Binomial name
- Phyllobius pyri (Linnaeus, 1758)

Synonyms
- Curculio pyri Linnaeus, 1758; Phyllobius piri

= Phyllobius pyri =

Species of beetle

Phyllobius pyri, the common leaf weevil, is a species of broad-nosed weevil belonging to the family Curculionidae subfamily Entiminae.

== Description ==
Phyllobius pyri on grass in a meadow

Phyllobius pyri can reach a length of 5-6.5 mm. The body is stocky, with broad elytra. Antennae and legs are reddish or brown, clubs of antennae are darker or black, sometimes legs and antennae are entirely black. Elytra have a ribbed appearance, they are black or brown, covered with hairlike shiny greyish, golden or coppery scales. This species develops on the fruit trees, mostly pears, on oak, beech and other deciduous trees, feeding on the leaves. Adults can be found from March to July.

== Distribution ==
These broad-nosed weevils are present in most of Europe, in the eastern Palearctic realm, and in the Near East.

== Habitat ==
This species prefers thickets, forest edges, orchards, parks and gardens.
