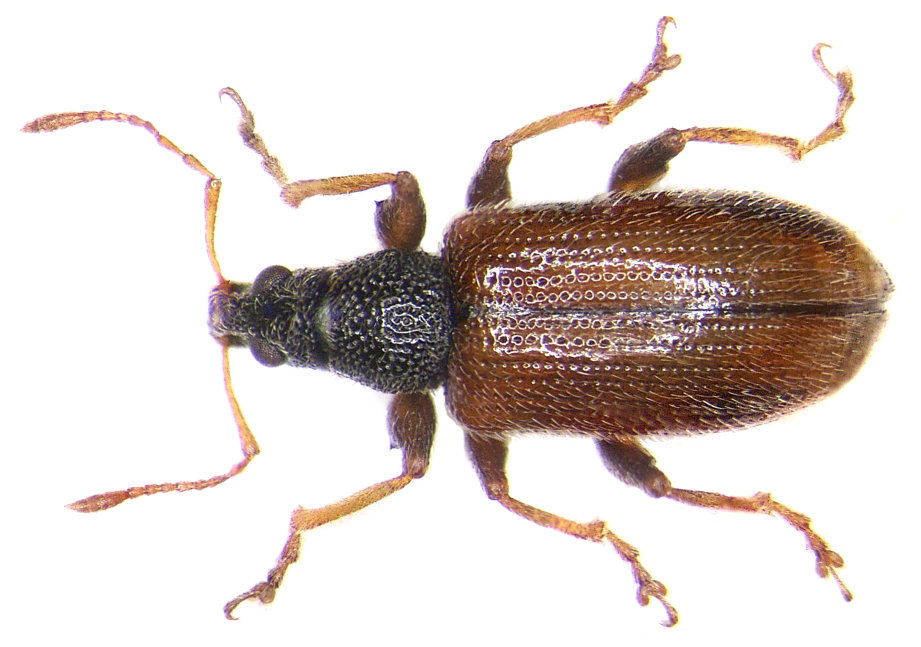
- Phyllobius oblongus

Scientific classification
- Kingdom: Animalia
- Phylum: Arthropoda
- Clade: Pancrustacea
- Class: Insecta
- Order: Coleoptera
- Suborder: Polyphaga
- Infraorder: Cucujiformia
- Superfamily: Curculionoidea
- Family: Curculionidae
- Genus: Phyllobius
- Species: P. oblongus

Binomial name
- Phyllobius oblongus (Linnaeus, 1758)

= Phyllobius oblongus =

Species of beetle

Phyllobius oblongus is a species of weevil native to Europe. It has been found in North America since 1969. Larvae feed on tree roots.
