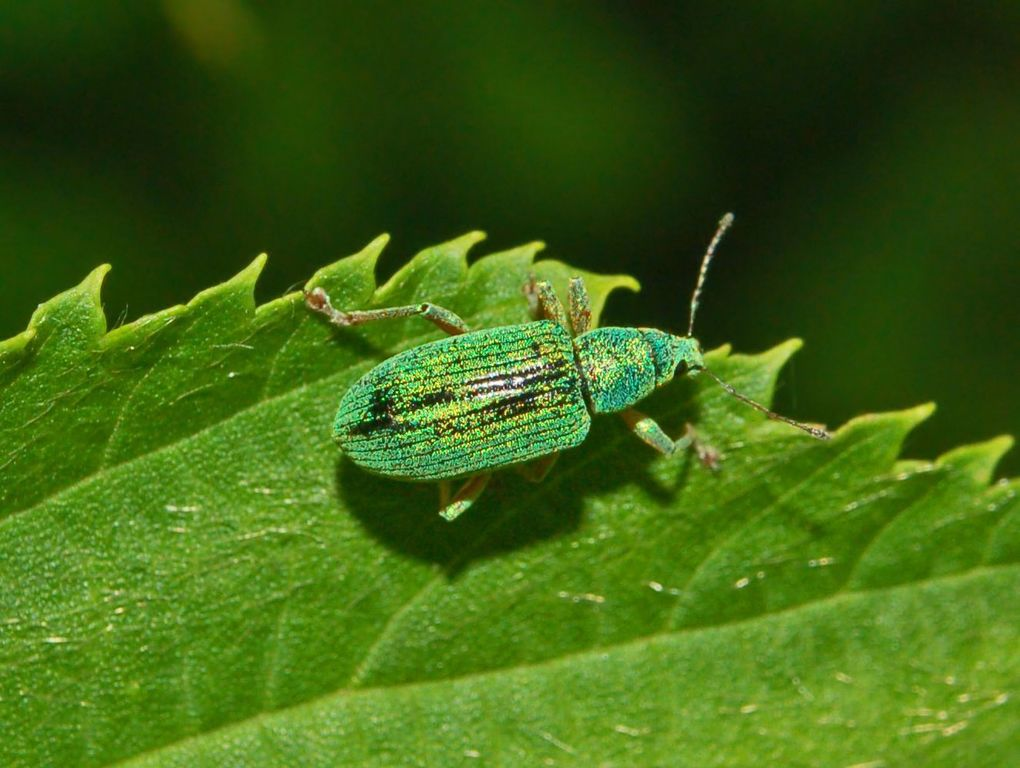

Scientific classification
- Kingdom: Animalia
- Phylum: Arthropoda
- Clade: Pancrustacea
- Class: Insecta
- Order: Coleoptera
- Suborder: Polyphaga
- Infraorder: Cucujiformia
- Superfamily: Curculionoidea
- Family: Curculionidae
- Genus: Polydrusus
- Species: P. formosus

Binomial name
- Polydrusus formosus (Mayer, 1779)

Synonyms
- Curculio formosus Mayer, 1779; Curculio sericeus Schaller, 1783 nec Goeze, 1777; Polydrusus sericeus (Schaller, 1783); Thomsoneonymus sericeus

= Polydrusus formosus =

Species of beetle

Polydrusus formosus, commonly known as the green immigrant leaf weevil, is a species of broad-nosed weevil belonging to the family Curculionidae, subfamily Entiminae.

== Distribution ==
This beetle is present in most of Europe and in the Nearctic realm.

== Description ==
The adults grow up to 5–6 millimetres (0.20–0.24 in) long. The colour of this insect is brilliant metallic green, as the black body is coated in emerald round scales. If the scales wear off the body beneath appears dark. Antennae are pale with a dark club. These beetles show a short groove between the eyes and evident striae on the elytra.

== Biology ==
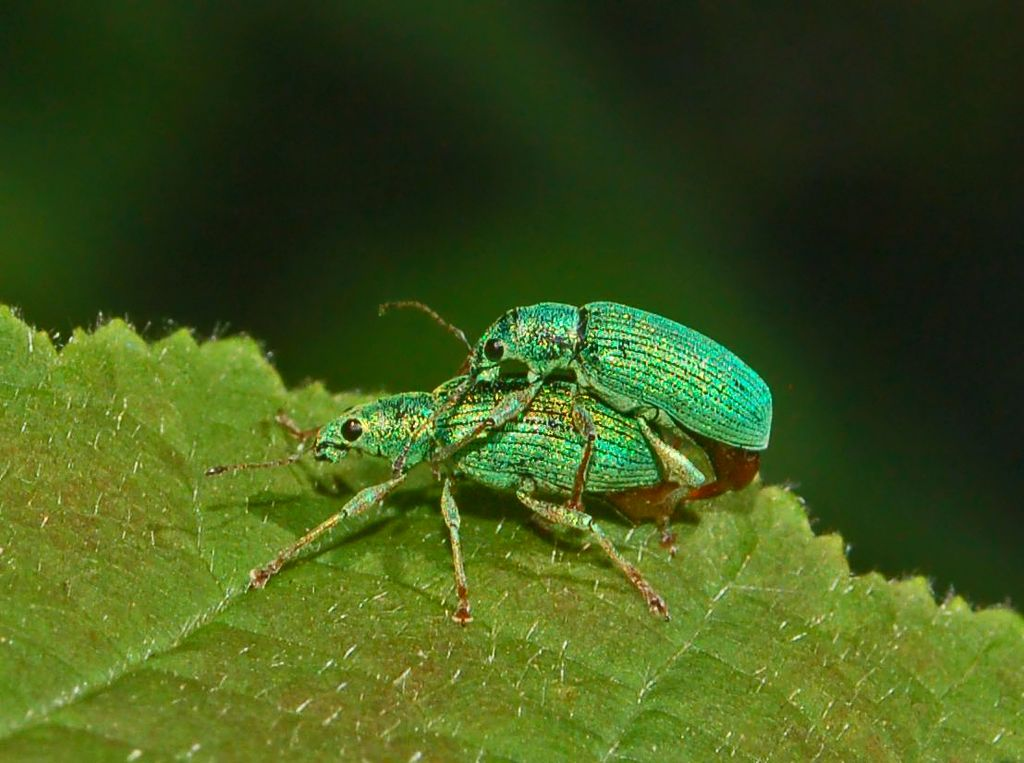
Polydrusus formosus – mating

Adults can mostly be encountered from April through August. These beetles lay their eggs in the bark or leaves of the host-plants. The soil-inhabiting larvae grow up to 7 millimetres (0.28 in) long feeding on juicy plant roots. In autumn their development is complete. They overwinter and pupate in spring.

The adults are eaters of young leaves and open blossoms of a wide variety of woodland trees and shrubs (Corylus avellana, Quercus species, etc.), but also fruit trees (apple, pear, cherry, etc.) They are considered a pest of fruit trees, causing extensive damages to their buds, blossoms and shoots.

== Bibliography ==
- Helden, A. 2005, Polydrusus (Chrysophis) formosus (Mayer, 1779) (Coleoptera: Curculionidae): a weevil new to Ireland, Irish Naturalists' Journal, 28
- A. G. Duff (2008). "Checklist of Beetles of the British Isles" (PDF). The Coleopterist. https://web.archive.org/web/20110705155707/http://www.coleopterist.org.uk/checklist2008%20A5.pdf. Retrieved August 13, 2010
- David V. Alford – Pests of fruit crops – Academic Press
