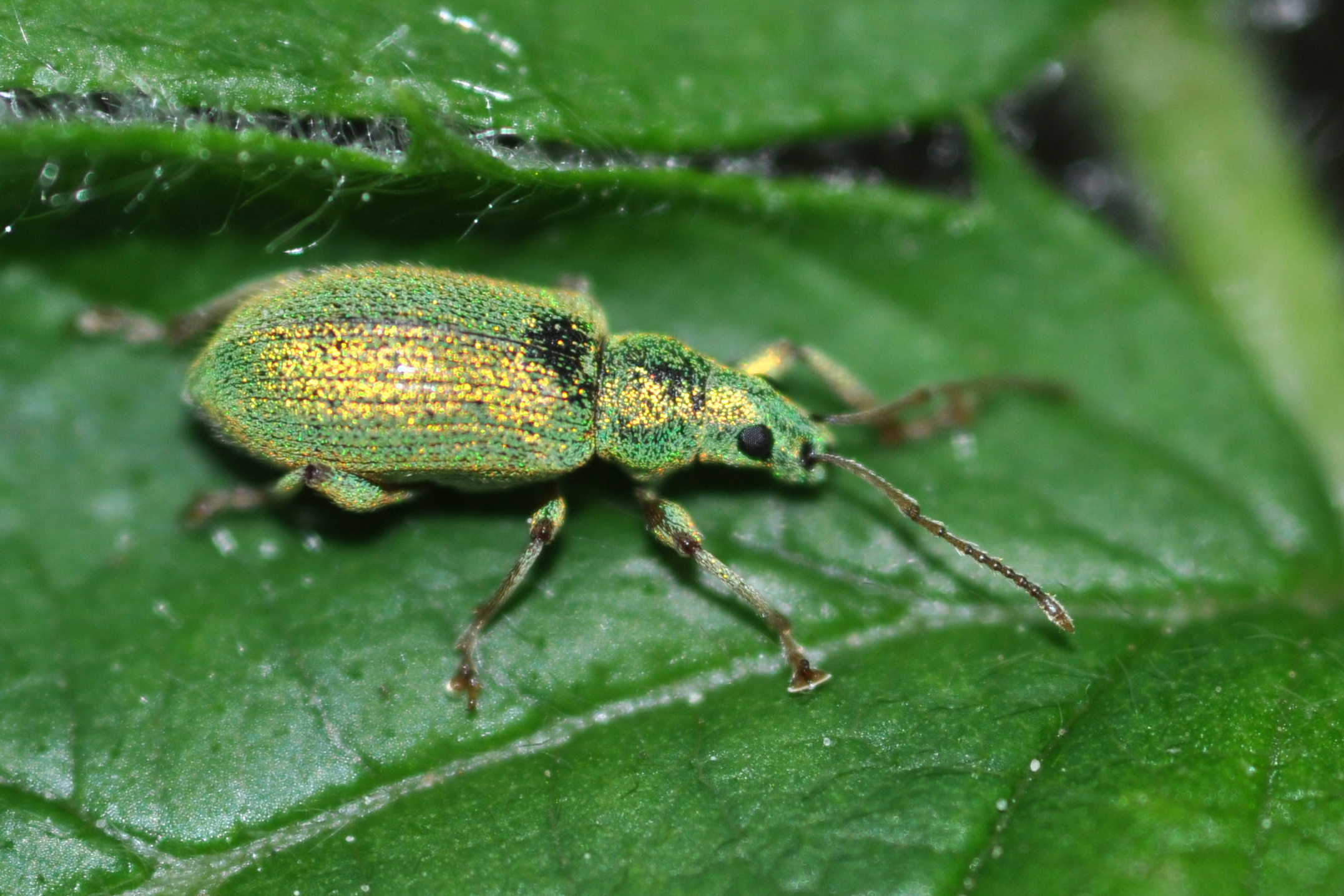

Scientific classification
- Kingdom: Animalia
- Phylum: Arthropoda
- Class: Insecta
- Order: Coleoptera
- Suborder: Polyphaga
- Infraorder: Cucujiformia
- Family: Curculionidae
- Genus: Phyllobius
- Species: P. argentatus

Binomial name
- Phyllobius argentatus Linnaeus, 1758

Synonyms
- Curculio sericeus Piller & Mitterpacher, 1783; Phyllobius budensis Hajóss, 1938; Phyllobius croaticus Stierlin, 1884; Phyllobius pineti Redtenbacher, 1849; Phyllobius sutorinensis Apfelbeck, 1898; Phyllobius tenuior Rey, 1894; Phyllobius tereticollis Gyllenhal, 1834; Phyllobius viridans Boheman, 1843

= Phyllobius argentatus =

Species of beetle

Phyllobius argentatus is a species of short-nosed weevil commonly known as the silver-green leaf weevil.

== Description ==
Phyllobius argentatus is a slender and elongate weevil, measuring 3.8-6.0 mm in length with bright metallic green scales on its elytra.

== Habitat and distribution ==
Phyllobius argentatus is associated with a broad range of host plant, including examples in the plant families Salicaceae, Rosaceae, Ulmaceae, Fagaceae, and Betulaceae.

It is widely distributed in Europe, where it may be regarded as a pest of fruit trees and hazelnuts where adult beetles may bite holes in leaves and flowers. The damage is, however, rarely important unless it occurs on young trees and nursery stocks.
