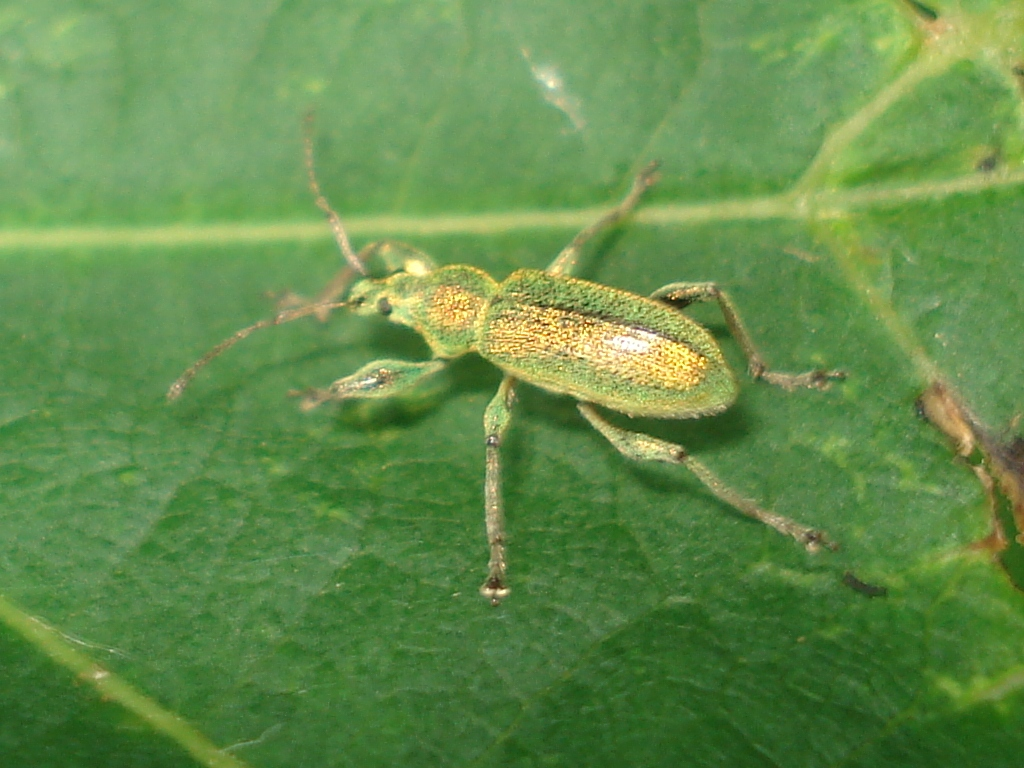
- Phyllobius arborator

Scientific classification
- Domain: Eukaryota
- Kingdom: Animalia
- Phylum: Arthropoda
- Class: Insecta
- Order: Coleoptera
- Suborder: Polyphaga
- Infraorder: Cucujiformia
- Family: Curculionidae
- Tribe: Phyllobiini
- Genus: Phyllobius; Germar, 1824

Diversity
- at least 160 species

= Phyllobius =

Genus of beetles

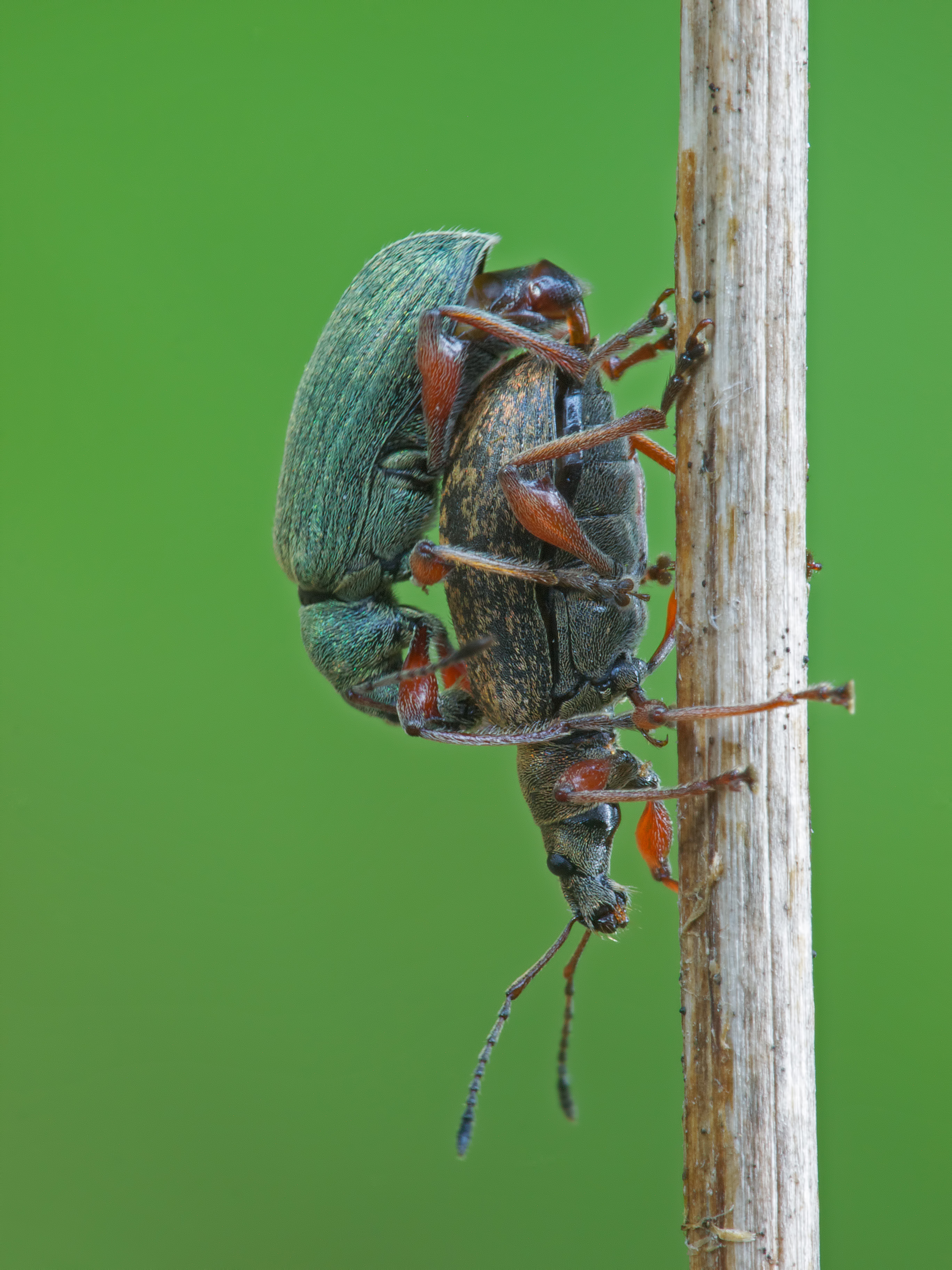
Phyllobius copulation

Phyllobius virideaeris in copula

Phyllobius is a genus of weevils containing at least 60 described species, some of which are commonly found in Europe.

== European species ==
- Phyllobius achardi Desbrochers, 1873
- Phyllobius aetolicus Apfelbeck, 1901
  - Phyllobius aetolicus aetolicus Apfelbeck, 1901
  - Phyllobius aetolicus albanicus Apfelbeck, 1916
- Phyllobius alpinus Stierlin, 1859
- Phyllobius arborator (Herbst, 1797)
- Phyllobius argentatus (Linnaeus, 1758)
  - Phyllobius argentatus argentatus (Linnaeus, 1758)
- Phyllobius betulinus (Bechstein & Scharfenberg, 1805)
  - Phyllobius betulinus betulinus (Bechstein & Scharfenberg, 1805)
  - Phyllobius betulinus hellenicus Apfelbeck, 1916
- Phyllobius brenskei Schilsky, 1911
- Phyllobius brevis Gyllenhal, 1834
- Phyllobius bulgaricus Apfelbeck, 1916
- Phyllobius calcaratus (Fabricius, 1792)
- Phyllobius canus Gyllenhal, 1834
- Phyllobius contemptus Schoenherr, 1832
- Phyllobius crassipes Motschulsky, 1860
- Phyllobius cupreoaureus Stierlin, 1861
- Phyllobius cylindricollis Gyllenhal, 1834
- Phyllobius dispar Redtenbacher, 1849
  - Phyllobius dispar dispar Redtenbacher, 1849
  - Phyllobius dispar merditanus Apfelbeck, 1916
- Phyllobius emeryi Desbrochers, 1873
- Phyllobius emgei Stierlin, 1887
- Phyllobius etruscus Desbrochers, 1873
- Phyllobius euchromus Reitter, 1885
- Phyllobius fessus Boheman, 1843
- Phyllobius flecki Reitter, 1906
- Phyllobius fulvago Gyllenhal, 1834
- Phyllobius fulvagoides Reitter, 1885
- Phyllobius ganglbaueri Apfelbeck, 1916
- Phyllobius glaucus (Scopoli, 1763)
- Phyllobius haberhaueri Apfelbeck, 1916
- Phyllobius insidiosus Pesarini, 1981
- Phyllobius insulanus Schilsky, 1911
- Phyllobius jacobsoni Smirnov, 1913
- Phyllobius korbi Schilsky, 1908
- Phyllobius lateralis Reiche, 1857
  - Phyllobius lateralis lateralis Reiche, 1857
  - Phyllobius lateralis stierlinensis Desbrochers, 1873
- Phyllobius leonisi Pic, 1902
- Phyllobius longipilis Boheman, 1843
- Phyllobius maculicornis Germar, 1824
  - Phyllobius maculicornis lucanus Solari & Solari, 1903
  - Phyllobius maculicornis maculicornis Germar, 1824
- Phyllobius meschniggi Solari, 1938
- Phyllobius montanus Miller, 1862
- Phyllobius noesskei Apfelbeck, 1916
- Phyllobius nudiamplus Reitter, 1916
  - Phyllobius nudiamplus pinkeri Voss, 1964
- Phyllobius oblongus (Linnaeus, 1758)
- Phyllobius pallidus (Fabricius, 1792)
- Phyllobius pellitus Boheman, 1843
- Phyllobius peneckei Solari, 1931
- Phyllobius pilicornis Desbrochers, 1873
- Phyllobius pilipes Desbrochers, 1873
- Phyllobius pomaceus Gyllenhal, 1834
- Phyllobius pyri (Linnaeus, 1758)
  - Phyllobius pyri italicus Solari & Solari, 1903
  - Phyllobius pyri pyri (Linnaeus, 1758)
  - Phyllobius pyri reicheidius Desbrochers, 1873
- Phyllobius quercicola Apfelbeck, 1916
- Phyllobius raverae Solari & Solari, 1903
- Phyllobius rhodopensis Apfelbeck, 1898
- Phyllobius roboretanus Gredler, 1882
- Phyllobius rochati Pesarini, 1981
- Phyllobius romanus Faust, 1890
- Phyllobius schatzmayri Pesarini, 1981
- Phyllobius seladonius Brullé, 1832
- Phyllobius squamosus C. Brisout, 1866
- Phyllobius subdentatus Boheman, 1843
- Phyllobius thalassinus Gyllenhal, 1834
- Phyllobius transsylvanicus Stierlin, 1894
- Phyllobius tuberculifer Chevrolat, 1865
- Phyllobius valonensis Apfelbeck, 1916
- Phyllobius versipellis Apfelbeck, 1916
- Phyllobius vespertilio Faust, 1884
  - Phyllobius vespertilio quercetorum Arnoldi, 1965
- Phyllobius vespertinus (Fabricius, 1792)
- Phyllobius virideaeris (Laicharting, 1781)
  - Phyllobius virideaeris cinereipennis Gyllenhal, 1834
  - Phyllobius virideaeris padanus Pesarini, 1975
  - Phyllobius virideaeris pedestris Schilsky, 1911
  - Phyllobius virideaeris virideaeris (Laicharting, 1781)
- Phyllobius viridicollis (Fabricius, 1792)
- Phyllobius xanthocnemus Kiesenwetter, 1852

== See also ==
- List of Phyllobius species

== Gallery ==
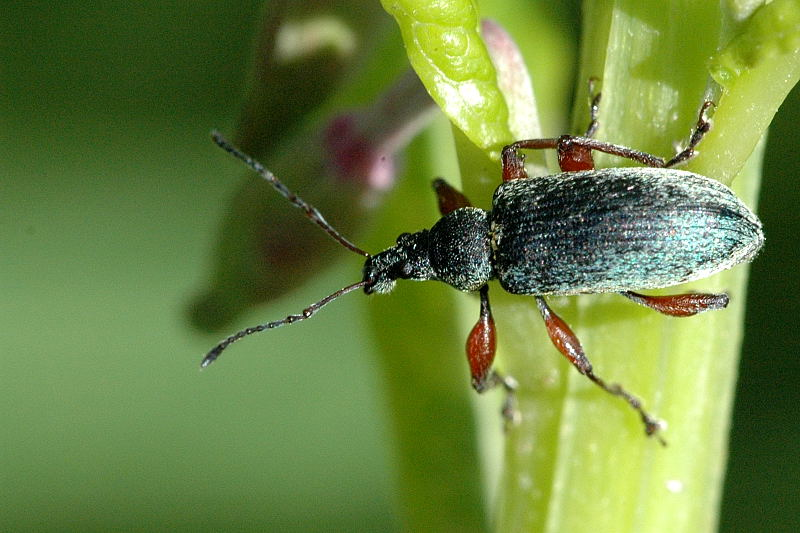
Phyllobius glaucus

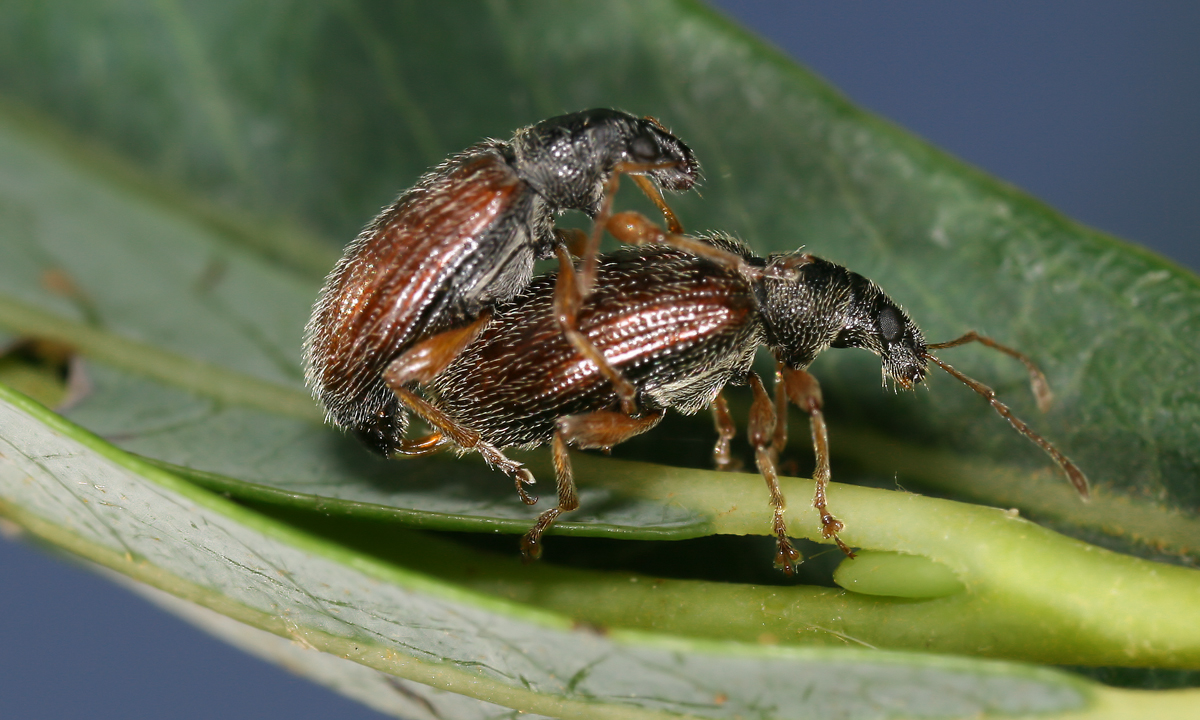
Phyllobius species mating couple

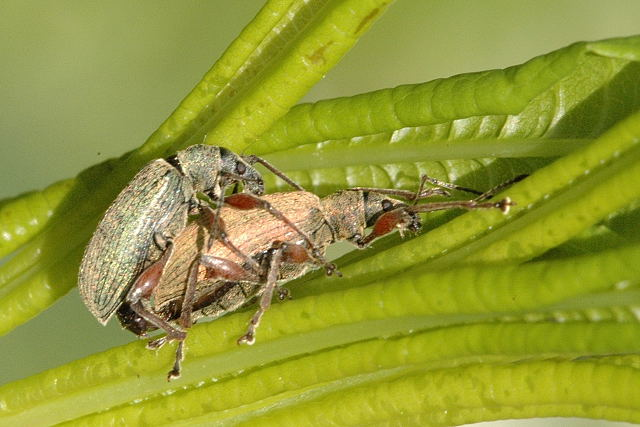
Phyllobius pyri mating couple

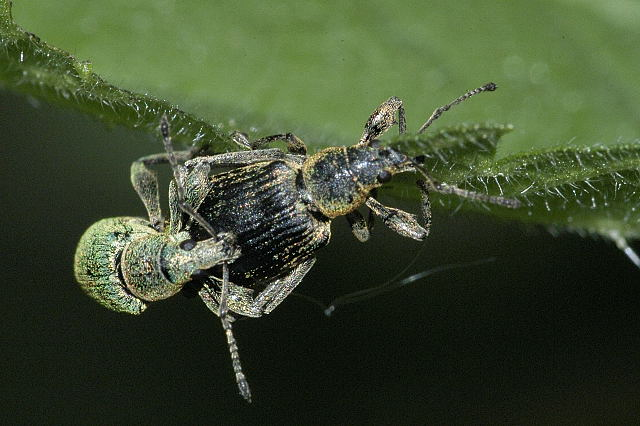
Phyllobius pomaceus mating couple
