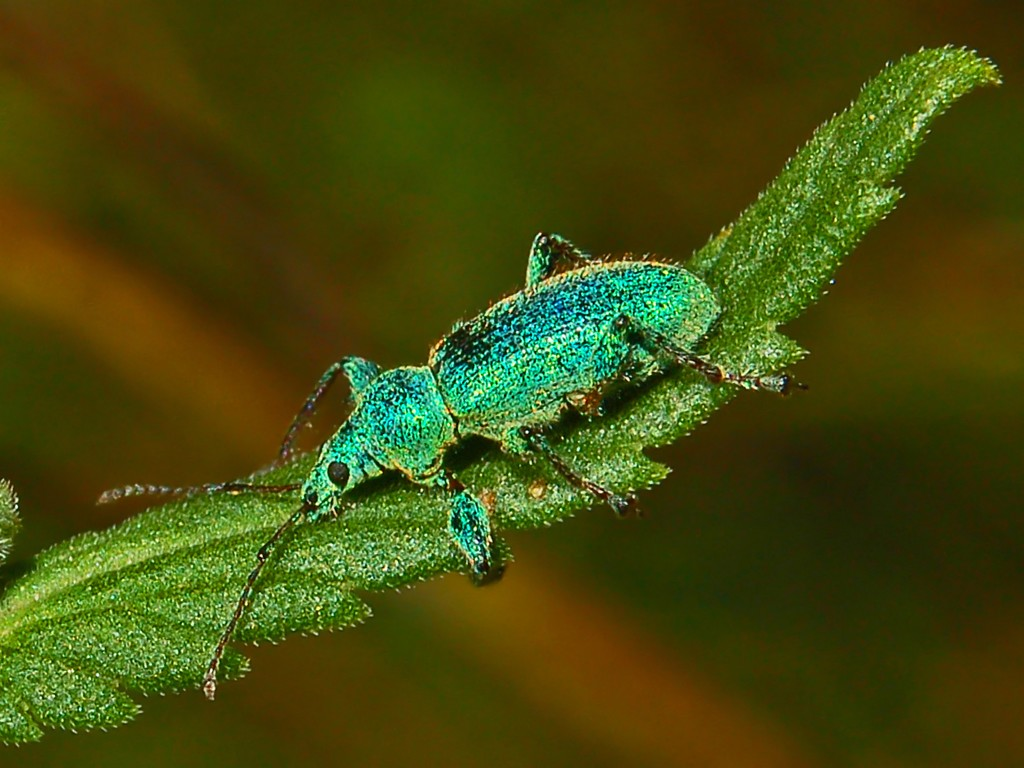
- Male

Scientific classification
- Kingdom: Animalia
- Phylum: Arthropoda
- Class: Insecta
- Order: Coleoptera
- Suborder: Polyphaga
- Infraorder: Cucujiformia
- Family: Curculionidae
- Genus: Phyllobius
- Species: P. arborator

Binomial name
- Phyllobius arborator (Herbst, 1797)

Synonyms
- Phyllobius psittacinus Germar, 1824; Phyllobius acuminatus Boheman, 1843; Phyllobius apfelbecki Stierlin, 1888

= Phyllobius arborator =

Species of beetle

Phyllobius arborator is a species of broad-nosed weevils belonging to the family Curculionidae, subfamily Entiminae.

This beetle is present in most of Europe.

The soil-living larvae feed on the roots of host plants, while the adults feed on leaves of deciduous trees and shrubs.

The adults grow up to about 10 millimetres (0.39 in) long and can be encountered from April through August. The colour of the body is metallic blue-green.
