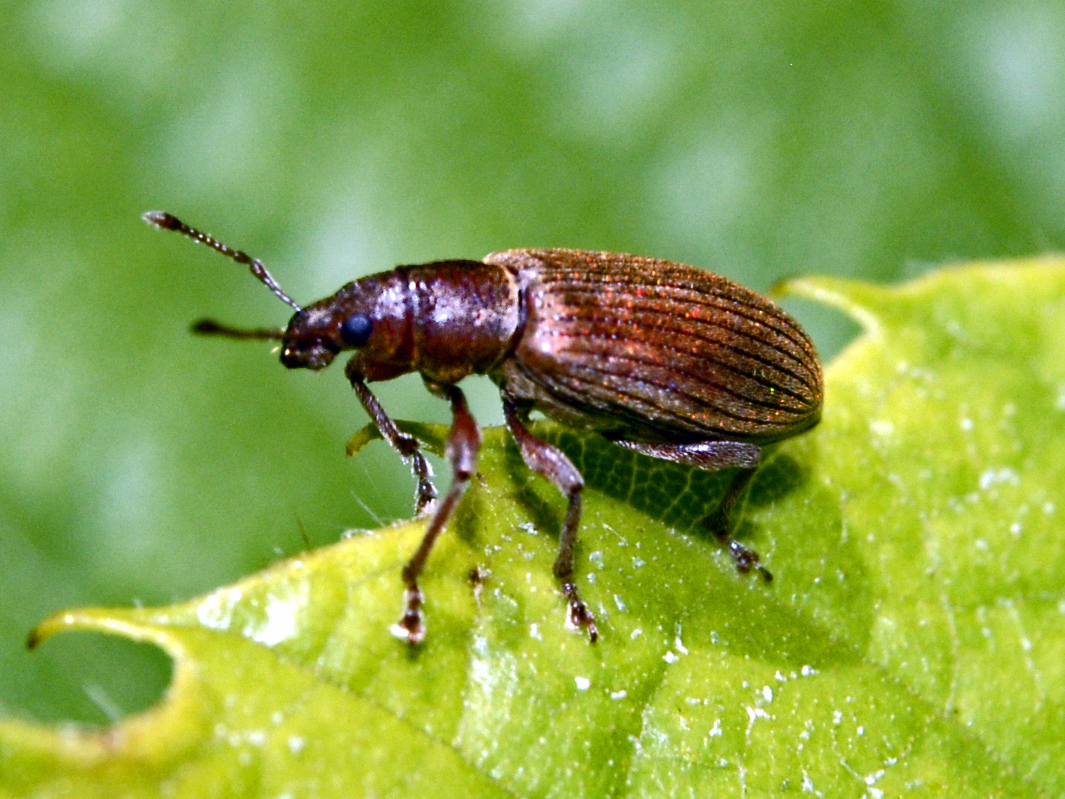
- Polydrusus impar

Scientific classification
- Domain: Eukaryota
- Kingdom: Animalia
- Phylum: Arthropoda
- Class: Insecta
- Order: Coleoptera
- Suborder: Polyphaga
- Infraorder: Cucujiformia
- Family: Curculionidae
- Tribe: Polydrusini
- Genus: Polydrusus; Germar, 1817

Diversity
- at least 220 species

= Polydrusus =

Genus of beetles

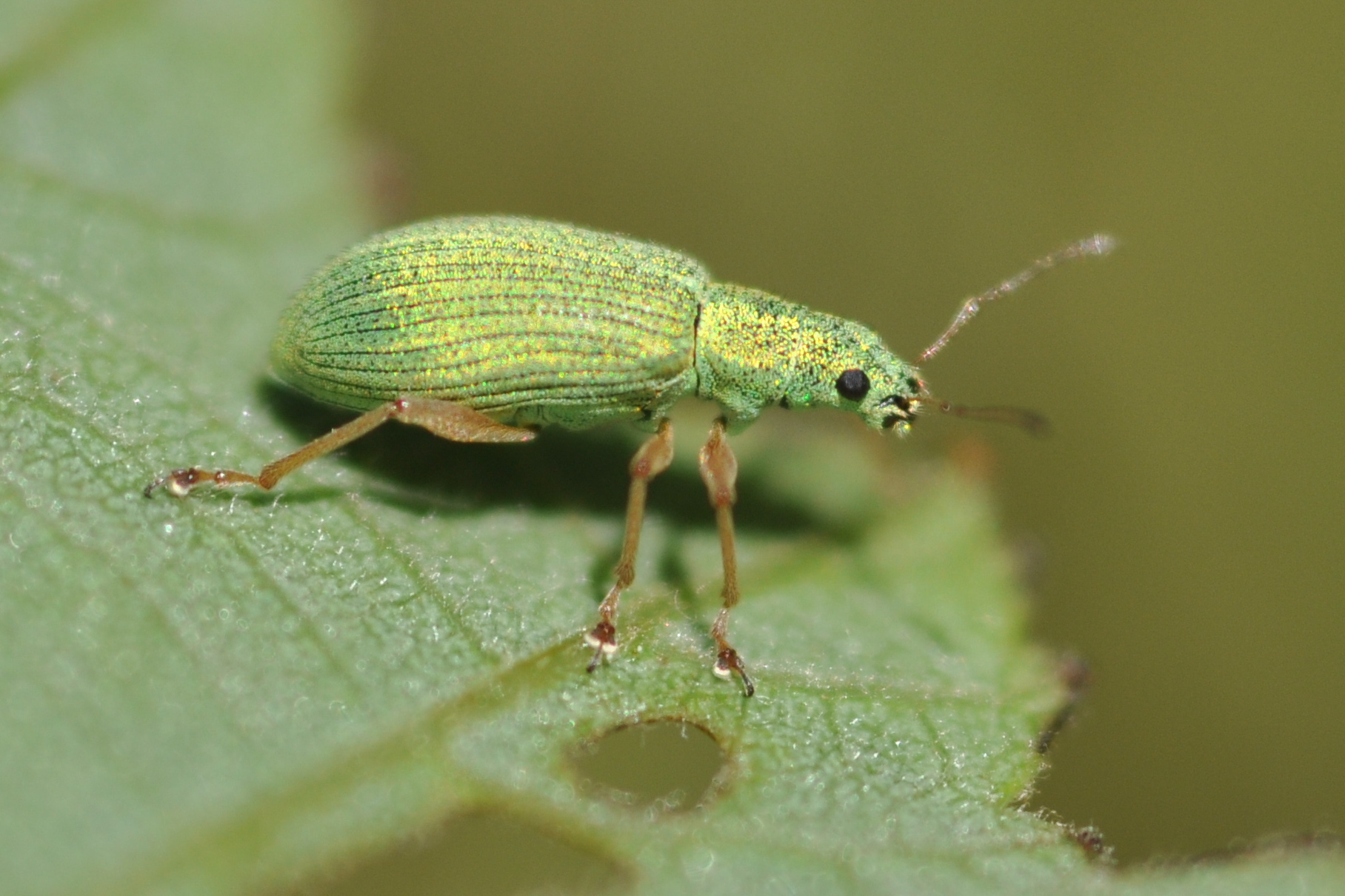
Polydrusus impressifrons

Polydrusus is a genus of weevils containing dozens of species, some of which are commonly found in Europe and northeastern North America. They are easily confused with Phyllobius, but are not as closely related as they seem at first glance.

== See also ==
- List of Polydrusus species
