= List of Tanymecus species =

This is a list of 103 species in Tanymecus, a genus of broad-nosed weevils in the family Curculionidae.

== Tanymecus species ==
- Tanymecus abyssinicus Hustache, 1920^{c g}
- Tanymecus agricola Marshall, 1920^{c g}
- Tanymecus albicans Rosenhauer, 1856^{c g}
- Tanymecus alboscutellatus Chevrolat, 1869^{c g}
- Tanymecus albus Gebler, 1830^{c g}
- Tanymecus alienus Faust, 1895^{c g}
- Tanymecus arenaceus Marshall, 1916^{c g}
- Tanymecus ariasi Escalera, 1914^{c g}
- Tanymecus arushanus Marshall, 1929^{c g}
- Tanymecus aureosauamosus Linell, 1896^{c g}
- Tanymecus bayeri Hustache, 1924^{c g}
- Tanymecus benguelensis Hustache, 1923^{c g}
- Tanymecus bidentatus Gebler, 1830^{c g}
- Tanymecus biplagiatus Marshall, 1935^{c g}
- Tanymecus boettcheri Voss, 1922^{c g}
- Tanymecus brachyderoides Faust, 1895^{c g}
- Tanymecus breviformis Reitter, 1903^{c g}
- Tanymecus brevirostris Aurivillius, 1910^{c g}
- Tanymecus brevis Chevrolat, 1860^{c g}
- Tanymecus bulgaricus Angelov, 1990^{c g}
- Tanymecus burmanus Marshall, 1916^{c g}
- Tanymecus cervinus Fahraeus, 1840^{c g}
- Tanymecus confusus Say, 1831^{i c g b}
- Tanymecus confususconfertus Gyllenhal, 1834^{c g}
- Tanymecus costulicollis Fairmaire, 1901^{c g}
- Tanymecus crassicornis Solari, 1904^{c g}
- Tanymecus curviscapus Marshall, 1916^{c g}
- Tanymecus deceptor Marshall, 1916^{c g}
- Tanymecus destructor Marshall, 1920^{c g}
- Tanymecus dilaticollis Gyllenhal, 1834^{c g}
- Tanymecus discolor Gyllenhal, 1834^{c g}
- Tanymecus excursor Faust, 1890^{c g}
- Tanymecus fausti Desbrochers des Loges, 1884^{c g}
- Tanymecus fimbriatus Faust, 1899^{c g}
- Tanymecus fruhstorferi Faust, 1896^{c g}
- Tanymecus furcatus Marshall, 1952^{c g}
- Tanymecus hirsutus Champion, 1911^{c g}
- Tanymecus hirticeps Marshall, 1916^{c g}
- Tanymecus hispidus Marshall, 1916^{c g}
- Tanymecus humilis Erichson, 1843^{c g}
- Tanymecus inaffectatus Fåhraeus, 1871^{c g}
- Tanymecus indicus Faust, 1895^{c g}
- Tanymecus infimus Thomson J., 1858^{c g}
- Tanymecus insipidus Chevrolat, 1878^{c g}
- Tanymecus kolenatii Reitter, 1903^{c g}
- Tanymecus konbiranus Marshall, 1916^{c g}
- Tanymecus kricheldorffi Reitter, 1915^{c g}
- Tanymecus lacaena (Herbst, 1797)^{i c g b}
- Tanymecus laminipes Marshall, 1951^{c g}
- Tanymecus latifrous Faust, 1899^{c g}
- Tanymecus lautus Le Conte, 1854^{c g}
- Tanymecus lectus Marshall, 1916^{c g}
- Tanymecus lineatus Gyllenhal, 1834^{c g}
- Tanymecus lomii Hustache, 1938^{c g}
- Tanymecus luridus Gestro, 1895^{c g}
- Tanymecus makkaliensis Fåhraeus, 1871^{c g}
- Tanymecus masaicus Voss, 1962^{c g}
- Tanymecus merus Marshall, 1954^{c g}
- Tanymecus metallinus Fairmaire, 1866^{c g}
- Tanymecus micans Hustache, 1920^{c g}
- Tanymecus migrans Fahraeus, 1840^{c g}
- Tanymecus mixtus Hustache, 1921^{c g}
- Tanymecus modicus Marshall, 1916^{c g}
- Tanymecus morosus Fairmaire, 1901^{c g}
- Tanymecus mozambicus Hustache, 1920^{c g}
- Tanymecus musculus Fahraeus, 1840^{c g}
- Tanymecus nevadensis Desbrochers des Loges, 1872^{c g}
- Tanymecus obconicicollis Voss, 1937^{c g}
- Tanymecus obscuriusculus Voss, 1962^{c g}
- Tanymecus obscurus Marshall, 1916^{c g}
- Tanymecus obsoletus Reitter, 1890^{c g}
- Tanymecus oculatus Chevrolat, 1880^{c g}
- Tanymecus orientalis Hustache, 1921^{c g}
- Tanymecus ovalipennis Hustache, 1935^{c g}
- Tanymecus palliatus (Fabricius, 1787)^{c g}
- Tanymecus parkiensis Ahmed, Rizvi, Akhter et Yasir, 2006^{c g}
- Tanymecus parvus Desbrochers des Loges, 1891^{c g}
- Tanymecus perrieri (Fairmaire, 1900)^{c g}
- Tanymecus piger Marshall, 1916^{c g}
- Tanymecus pisciformis (Fairmaire, 1899)^{c g}
- Tanymecus ponticus Arnoldi & Blinstein, 1971^{c g}
- Tanymecus potteri Hustache, 1920^{c g}
- Tanymecus princeps (Faust, 1891)^{c g}
- Tanymecus pseudohispidus Rizvi, Ahmed et Naz, 2003^{c g}
- Tanymecus pubirostris Reitter, 1903^{c g}
- Tanymecus rapax Marshall, 1939^{c g}
- Tanymecus revelierei Tournier, 1875^{c g}
- Tanymecus rhodopus Fåhraeus, 1871^{c g}
- Tanymecus seclusus Faust, 1895^{c g}
- Tanymecus sitonoides A. Solari & F. Solari, 1909^{c g}
- Tanymecus sparsus Fahraeus, 1840^{c g}
- Tanymecus submaculatus Chevrolat, 1860^{c g}
- Tanymecus telephus Reitter, 1903^{c g}
- Tanymecus tenuis Reitter, 1903^{c g}
- Tanymecus tessellatus Marshall, 1935^{c g}
- Tanymecus tetricus Faust, 1897^{c g}
- Tanymecus texanus Van Dyke, 1935^{i g b}
- Tanymecus tonsus Marshall, 1935^{c g}
- Tanymecus trivialis Fahraeus, 1840^{c g}
- Tanymecus vagabundus Chevrolat, 1880^{c g}
- Tanymecus variabilis Fahraeus, 1840^{c g}
- Tanymecus versutus Faust, 1895^{c g}
- Tanymecus villicus Fahraeus, 1840^{c g}

Data sources: i = ITIS, c = Catalogue of Life, g = GBIF, b = Bugguide.net
