= Dereodus sparsus =

Scientific classification
- Kingdom: Animalia
- Phylum: Arthropoda
- Class: Insecta
- Order: Coleoptera
- Suborder: Polyphaga
- Infraorder: Cucujiformia
- Family: Curculionidae
- Tribe: Tanymecini
- Subtribe: Piazomiina
- Genus: Dereodus
- Species: D. sparsus

Binomial name
- Dereodus sparsus Boheman, 1840

Synonyms
- Hypomeces sparsus Boheman, 1840; Dereodus (Grypnus) indicus Desbrochers, 1891; Dereodus sparsus var. prasinus Heller, 1901

Species of beetle

Dereodus sparsus is a species of weevil found in India and Sri Lanka.

== Description ==
This species has a body length is about 7.5 to 10.5 mm. Body black, with thin grey scales. These scales are broken up into small irregular spots on the elytra. Prothornx consists of a narrow lateral pale line. Head coarsely punctate and wrinkled. Eyes are rather more prominent. Prothorax much broader. Elytra more acuminate behind, and more coarsely punctate. Elytral scales are larger and less dense, and almost circular.
