= Dereodus mastos =

Scientific classification
- Kingdom: Animalia
- Phylum: Arthropoda
- Class: Insecta
- Order: Coleoptera
- Suborder: Polyphaga
- Infraorder: Cucujiformia
- Family: Curculionidae
- Tribe: Tanymecini
- Subtribe: Piazomiina
- Genus: Dereodus
- Species: D. mastos

Binomial name
- Dereodus mastos (Herbst, 1797)

Synonyms
- Curculio mastos Herbst, 1797; Hypomeces guttulatus Desbrochers des Loges, 1891

Species of beetle

Dereodus mastos, is a species of weevil found in India, Sri Lanka and introduced to Australia.

== Description ==
This species has a body length is about 8.75 to 9.5 mm. Body shining black, clothely variegated with whitish or greyish scales. Head shallowly punctate. Circular eyes are very prominent, and subconical. There is a denser stripe found on each side of the head. A broad lateral stripe can be seen on the prothorax and an indistinct narrow central stripe. Elytra slightly acuminate behind and apices are shortly mucronate. In male, elytra variegated with small scattered spots. Sometimes there is an ill-defined broad lateral stripe on elytra.

Adult beetles feed on tender leaves of Manilkara zapota. Instead, it is also found in plants such as Vachellia nilotica, Hibiscus cannabinus and Vachellia nilotica indica.
