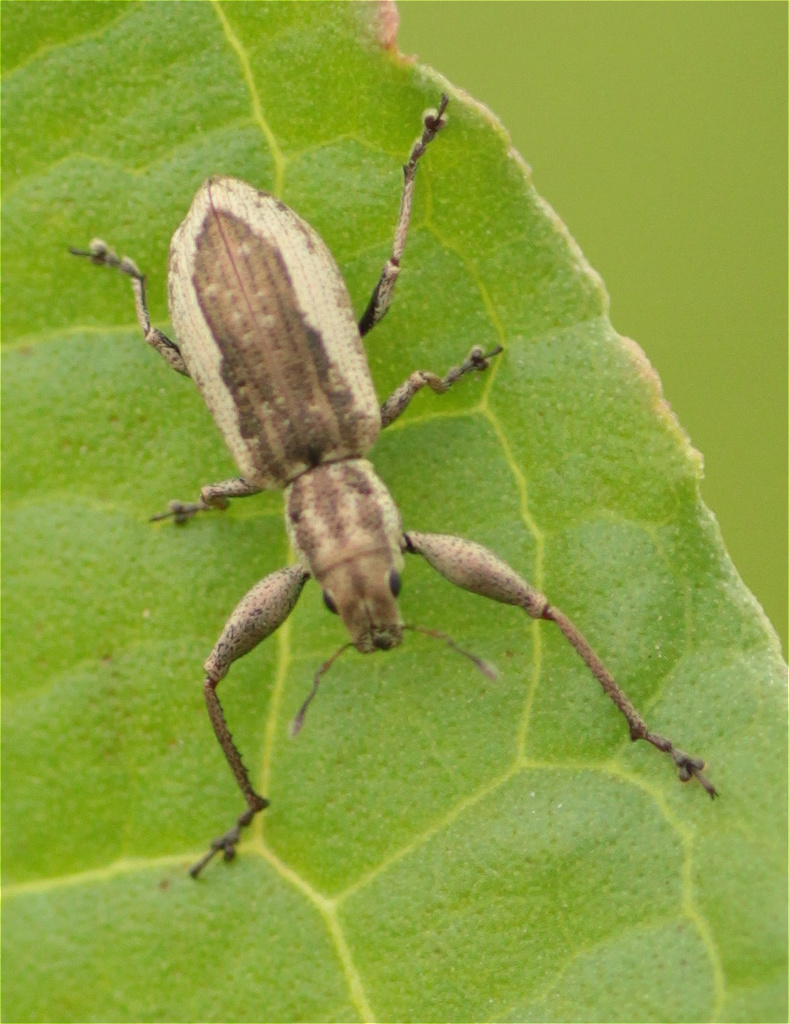
- Dorsal view of Pandeleteius sp.

Scientific classification
- Domain: Eukaryota
- Kingdom: Animalia
- Phylum: Arthropoda
- Class: Insecta
- Order: Coleoptera
- Suborder: Polyphaga
- Infraorder: Cucujiformia
- Superfamily: Curculionoidea
- Family: Curculionidae
- Genus: Pandeleteius; Schönherr, 1834

= Pandeleteius =

Genus of beetles

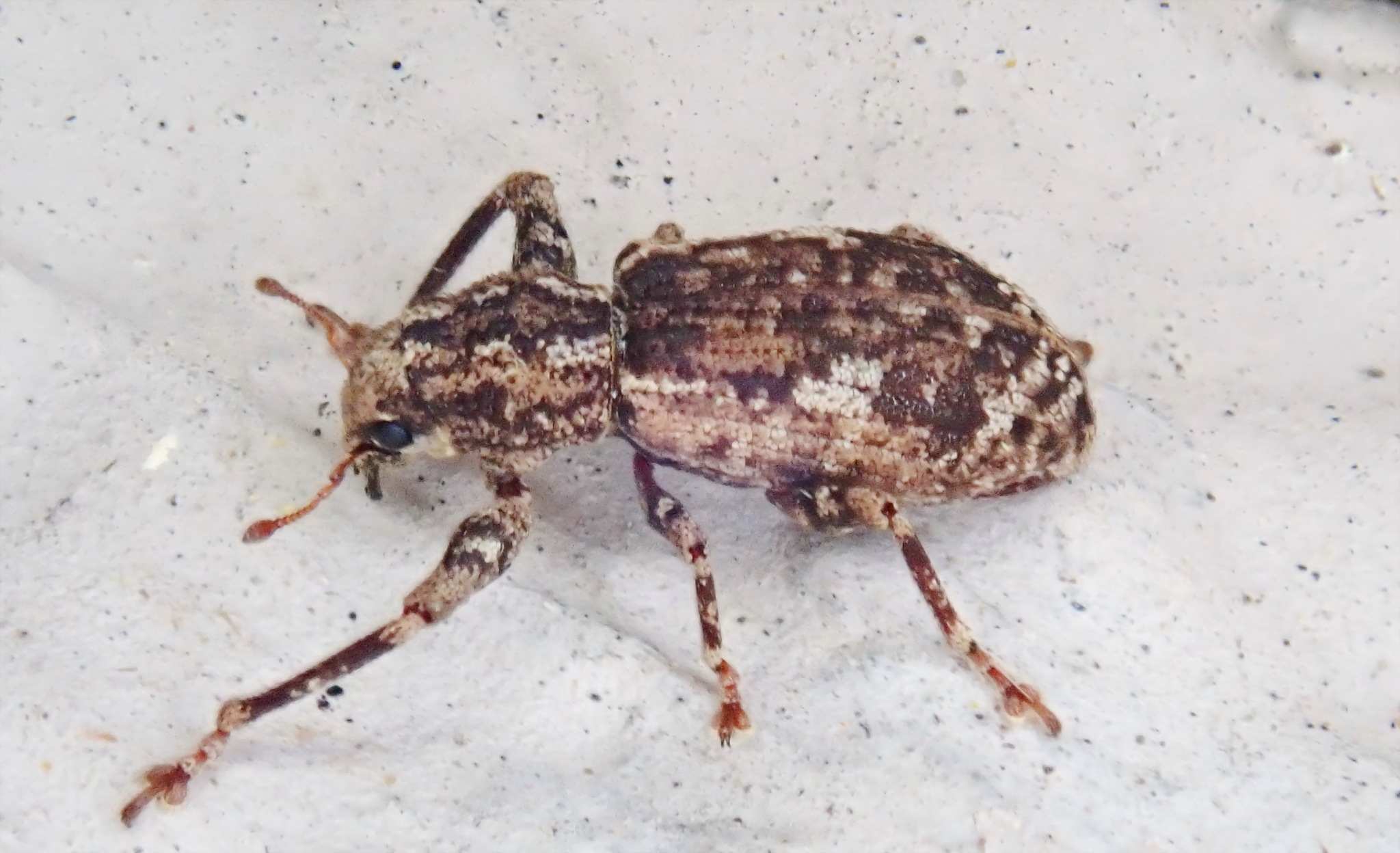
Pandeleteius hilaris, Virginia

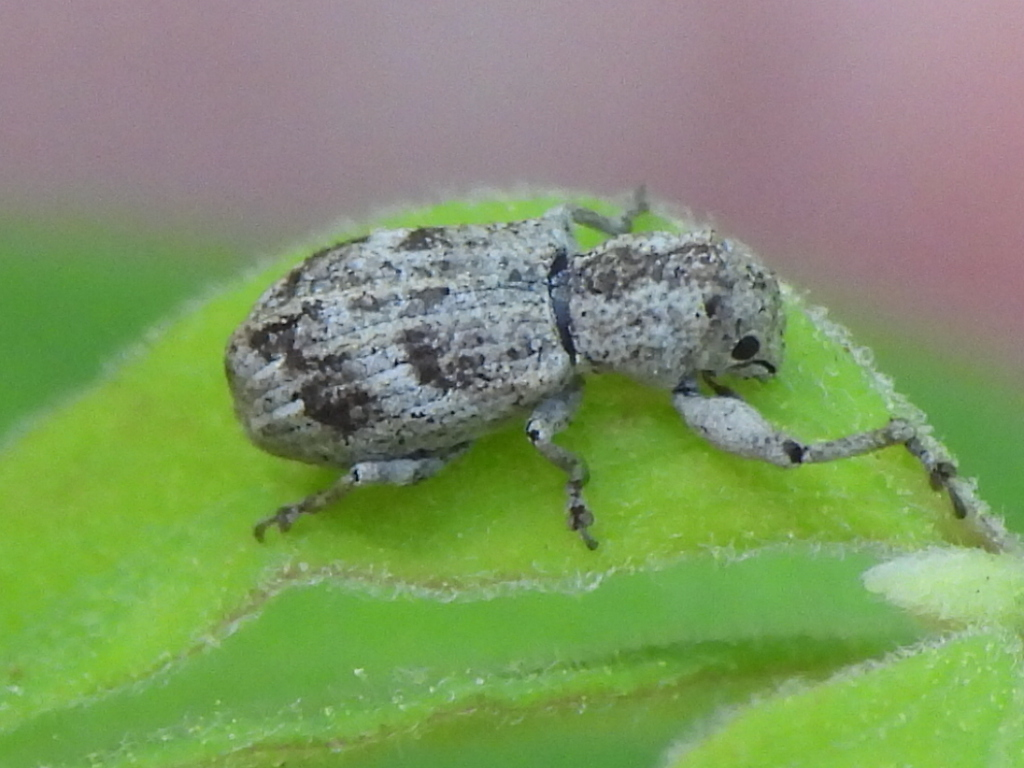
Pandeleteius cinereus, Texas

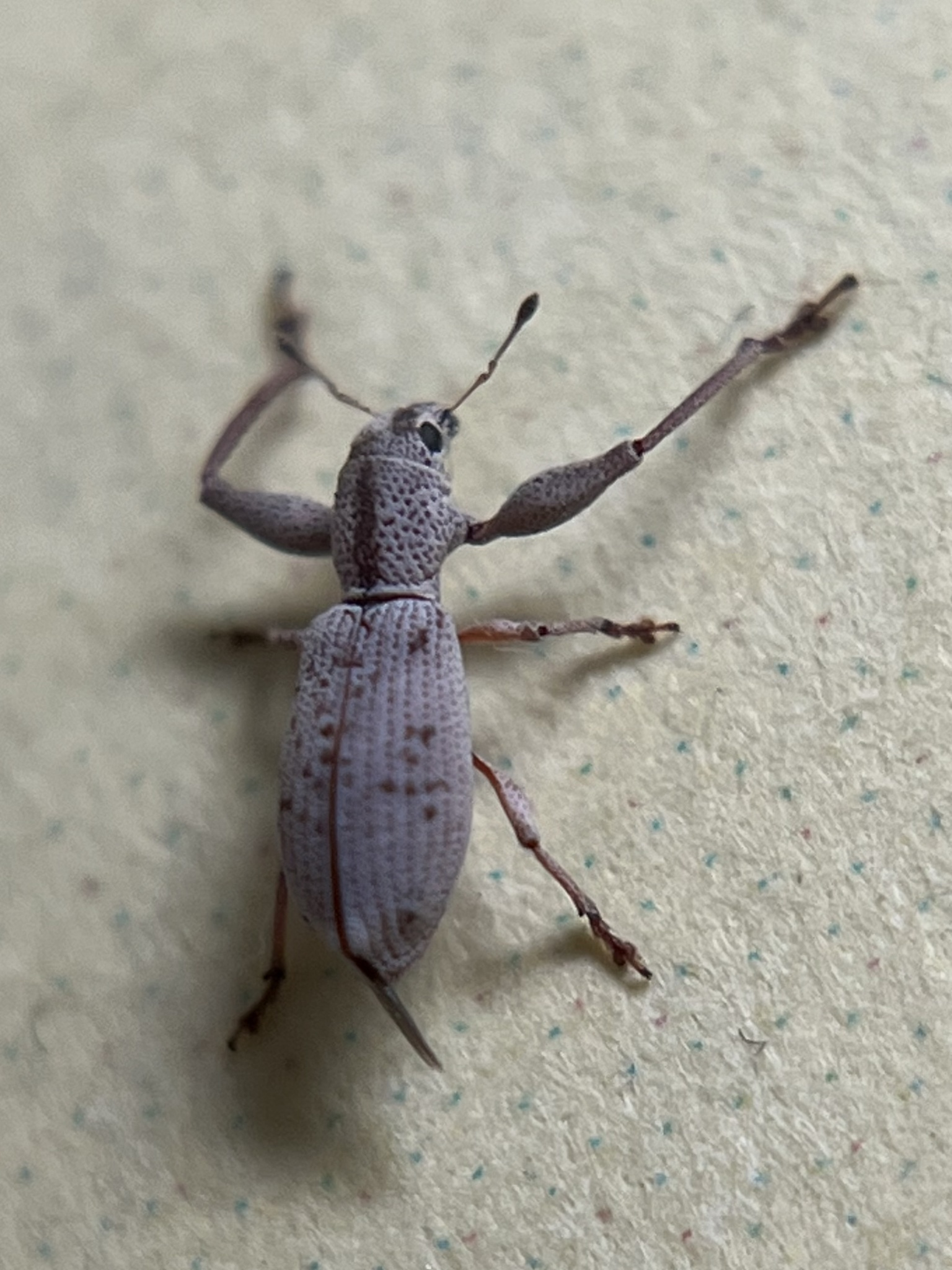
Pandeleteius nodifer, Florida

Pandeleteius is a genus of broad-nosed weevils in the family Curculionidae. There are over 150 described species in Pandeleteius, distributed across the Americas. Most species in the genus were described by Anne Howden. Species of Pandeleteius can be found in most countries of North, Central, and South America.

== Taxonomy ==
The genus Pandeleteius was named for the first time by Carl Johan Schönherr in 1834, page 129. It belongs to the subfamily Entiminae, tribe Tanymecini.

== Species ==
These 163 species belong to the genus Pandeleteius:

- Pandeleteius admirabilis Howden, 1976
- Pandeleteius albisquamis Champion, 1911
- Pandeleteius albus Hustache, 1923
- Pandeleteius amulae Champion, 1911
- Pandeleteius andeanus Howden, 1976
- Pandeleteius angustirostris Faust, 1892
- Pandeleteius annae Anderson & Ivie, 2015
- Pandeleteius anneae Anderson & Ivie, 2015
- Pandeleteius antiochensis Howden, 1976
- Pandeleteius arcanus Howden, 1976
- Pandeleteius argentatus Olliff, 1891
- Pandeleteius armatus Champion, 1911
- Pandeleteius aspericollis Hustache, 1926
- Pandeleteius assimilis Voss, 1934
- Pandeleteius atlas Howden, 1976
- Pandeleteius attenuatus Howden, 1959
- Pandeleteius avilensis Howden, 1976
- Pandeleteius baccatus Howden, 1996
- Pandeleteius baccharis Kuschel, 1949
- Pandeleteius bechyneorum Howden, 1976
- Pandeleteius bidentatus Howden, 1976
- Pandeleteius biseriatus Kirsch, 1974
- Pandeleteius bolivari Howden, 2004
- Pandeleteius bordoni Howden, 1976
- Pandeleteius brasilianus Voss, 1954
- Pandeleteius brevinasus Champion, 1911
- Pandeleteius brevipes Champion, 1911
- Pandeleteius brevitarsis Hustache, 1938
- Pandeleteius buchanani Howden, 1959
- Pandeleteius campestris Howden, 1976
- Pandeleteius candidus Howden, 1976
- Pandeleteius carinifenis Howden, 1976
- Pandeleteius carnpbelli Howden, 1976
- Pandeleteius championi Howden, 1974
- Pandeleteius chapini Howden, 1976
- Pandeleteius ciliatipenis Champion, 1911
- Pandeleteius cinereus (Horn, 1876)
- Pandeleteius circumcisus Howden, 1976
- Pandeleteius clarki Howden, 2004
- Pandeleteius clavisetis Champion, 1911
- Pandeleteius cliuus Howden, 1976
- Pandeleteius colatus Howden, 1996
- Pandeleteius commutabilis Howden, 1976
- Pandeleteius confinis Howden, 1996
- Pandeleteius confluens Howden, 1976
- Pandeleteius conirostris Howden, 1976
- Pandeleteius connatus Howden, 1996
- Pandeleteius conspersus Champion, 1911
- Pandeleteius cornelli Howden, 1996
- Pandeleteius crispus Champion, 1911
- Pandeleteius cucullatus Champion, 1911
- Pandeleteius cuneatus Champion, 1911
- Pandeleteius cupidus Howden, 1976
- Pandeleteius defectus Green, 1920
- Pandeleteius dentipes Pierce, 1913
- Pandeleteius dissimilis Voss, 1939
- Pandeleteius distinctus (Voss, 1954)
- Pandeleteius ductilis Howden, 2004
- Pandeleteius eberhardi Howden, 1976
- Pandeleteius ecuadorensis Howden, 1976
- Pandeleteius emarginatus Girón & Howden, 2019
- Pandeleteius ephippiatus Champion, 1911
- Pandeleteius excisus Howden, 1976
- Pandeleteius fasciatus Champion, 1911
- Pandeleteius femoralis Champion, 1911
- Pandeleteius festivus Howden, 1976
- Pandeleteius flavus Howden, 1976
- Pandeleteius flexilis Champion, 1911
- Pandeleteius florivorus Howden, 1998
- Pandeleteius genieri Girón & Howden, 2019
- Pandeleteius giganteus Howden, 1976
- Pandeleteius gracilis Howden, 1976
- Pandeleteius griseus Voss, 1954
- Pandeleteius guriensis Howden, 2004
- Pandeleteius hadromeroides (Kirsch, 1868)
- Pandeleteius haruspex Howden, 1986
- Pandeleteius henryi Howden, 1959
- Pandeleteius hercules Howden, 1976
- Pandeleteius hieroglyphicus Champion, 1911
- Pandeleteius hilaris (Herbst, 1797)
- Pandeleteius hirtipes Champion, 1911
- Pandeleteius hispidus Champion, 1911
- Pandeleteius humboldti Howden, 1976
- Pandeleteius hystrix Howden, 1976
- Pandeleteius inflatus Champion, 1911
- Pandeleteius julius Howden, 1976
- Pandeleteius kirschi Faust, 1892
- Pandeleteius laticeps Champion, 1911
- Pandeleteius latirostris Hustache, 1938
- Pandeleteius liberalis Howden, 1976
- Pandeleteius longicollis Champion, 1911
- Pandeleteius longipennis Howden, 1976
- Pandeleteius maculatus Hustache, 1923
- Pandeleteius maculicollis Champion, 1911
- Pandeleteius mesosternalis Howden, 1996
- Pandeleteius metallicus Anderson & Ivie, 2015
- Pandeleteius microcephalus Champion, 1911
- Pandeleteius minax Dohrn, 1880
- Pandeleteius mirirostris Howden, 1976
- Pandeleteius modestus Faust, 1892
- Pandeleteius multiseriatus Howden, 1976
- Pandeleteius naupactoides Pascoe, 1881
- Pandeleteius nodifer Champion, 1911
- Pandeleteius notabilis Howden, 1976
- Pandeleteius novagranadae Howden, 1976
- Pandeleteius obliquus Champion, 1911
- Pandeleteius obrienorum Girón & Howden, 2019
- Pandeleteius oljmpus Howden, 1976
- Pandeleteius opalescens Faust, 1892
- Pandeleteius ornatifrons Champion, 1911
- Pandeleteius pavo Girón & Howden, 2019
- Pandeleteius peckorum Howden, 1976
- Pandeleteius penai Howden, 1996
- Pandeleteius peruvianus Voss, 1954
- Pandeleteius pilosipectus Howden, 1976
- Pandeleteius platensis Brèthes, 1913
- Pandeleteius plumosiventris Howden, 1959
- Pandeleteius pollinosus Howden, 1996
- Pandeleteius porosus Boheman, 1840
- Pandeleteius procollis Howden, 1976
- Pandeleteius pygmaeus Howden, 1976
- Pandeleteius quadrinodosus Champion, 1911
- Pandeleteius quichensis Champion, 1911
- Pandeleteius reductus Howden, 1976
- Pandeleteius regina Howden, 1976
- Pandeleteius robustulus Emden, 1939
- Pandeleteius robustus (Schaeffer, 1908)
- Pandeleteius rotundicollis (Fall, 1907)
- Pandeleteius sabanaensis Howden, 2004
- Pandeleteius sahlbergi Howden, 2011
- Pandeleteius santaanae Howden, 1976
- Pandeleteius santamartae Howden, 1976
- Pandeleteius scorpiodes Howden, 1996
- Pandeleteius scutellatus Howden, 1976
- Pandeleteius senliconnatus Howden, 1996
- Pandeleteius separatus Howden, 1976
- Pandeleteius signatus Voss, 1954
- Pandeleteius simplarius (Fall, 1907)
- Pandeleteius sinuatipes Champion, 1911
- Pandeleteius smithsoni Howden, 1996
- Pandeleteius spinipennis Howden, 1996
- Pandeleteius sublineatus Champion, 1911
- Pandeleteius submaculatus Voss, 1932
- Pandeleteius subtilis Howden, 1996
- Pandeleteius summus Howden, 1976
- Pandeleteius tessellatus Howden, 1976
- Pandeleteius testaceipes Hustache, 1929
- Pandeleteius thomasi Howden, 1996
- Pandeleteius tibialis Boheman, 1840
- Pandeleteius tinctorius Howden, 1976
- Pandeleteius torosus Howden, 1996
- Pandeleteius torquatus Howden, 1976
- Pandeleteius trinidadensis Howden, 2004
- Pandeleteius truncatus Howden, 1976
- Pandeleteius tupi Girón & Howden, 2019
- Pandeleteius undatus Champion, 1911
- Pandeleteius upsilon Howden, 1976
- Pandeleteius varicolor Champion, 1911
- Pandeleteius variegatus (Pierce, 1915)
- Pandeleteius variogenitus K.Günther, 1933
- Pandeleteius vasquezi Howden, 2001
- Pandeleteius viridiventris Champion, 1911
- Pandeleteius vitticollis Champion, 1911
