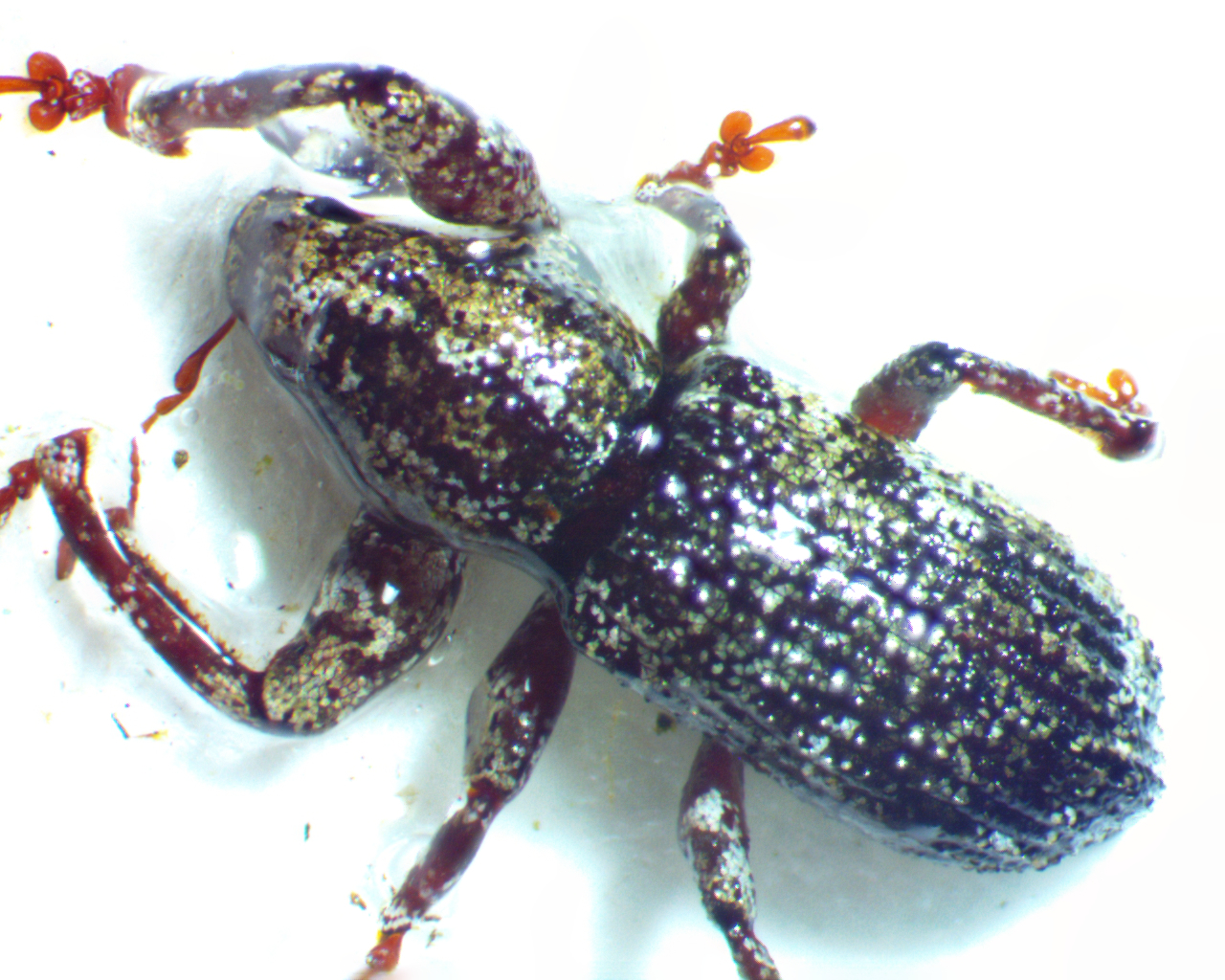

Scientific classification
- Kingdom: Animalia
- Phylum: Arthropoda
- Class: Insecta
- Order: Coleoptera
- Suborder: Polyphaga
- Infraorder: Cucujiformia
- Family: Curculionidae
- Genus: Pandeleteius
- Species: P. hilaris

Binomial name
- Pandeleteius hilaris (Herbst, 1797)

Synonyms
- Pandeleteius pauperculus Gyllenhal, 1834

= Pandeleteius hilaris =

Species of beetle

Pandeleteius hilaris is a species of broad-nosed weevil in the beetle family Curculionidae. It is found in North America.
