= Tanymecus confusus =

Scientific classification
- Domain: Eukaryota
- Kingdom: Animalia
- Phylum: Arthropoda
- Class: Insecta
- Order: Coleoptera
- Suborder: Polyphaga
- Infraorder: Cucujiformia
- Family: Curculionidae
- Genus: Tanymecus
- Species: T. confusus

Binomial name
- Tanymecus confusus Say, 1831

Synonyms
- Tanymecus confertus Gyllenhal, 1834; Tanymecus variabilis Fahraeus, 1840

Species of beetle

Tanymecus confusus is a species of broad-nosed weevil in the beetle family Curculionidae. It is found in North America.
