= Pandeleteinus lucidillus =

Scientific classification
- Kingdom: Animalia
- Phylum: Arthropoda
- Clade: Pancrustacea
- Class: Insecta
- Order: Coleoptera
- Suborder: Polyphaga
- Infraorder: Cucujiformia
- Family: Curculionidae
- Genus: Pandeleteinus
- Species: P. lucidillus

Binomial name
- Pandeleteinus lucidillus Howden, 1959

Species of beetle

Pandeleteinus lucidillus is a species of broad-nosed weevil in the beetle family Curculionidae. It is found in North America.
