= Pandeleteius rotundicollis =

Scientific classification
- Domain: Eukaryota
- Kingdom: Animalia
- Phylum: Arthropoda
- Class: Insecta
- Order: Coleoptera
- Suborder: Polyphaga
- Infraorder: Cucujiformia
- Family: Curculionidae
- Genus: Pandeleteius
- Species: P. rotundicollis

Binomial name
- Pandeleteius rotundicollis (Fall, 1907)

Synonyms
- Pandeleteius bryanti Tanner, 1954; Pandeleteius depressus Pierce, 1913

Species of beetle

Pandeleteius rotundicollis is a species of broad-nosed weevil in the beetle family Curculionidae. It is found in North America.
