= Minyomerus microps =

Scientific classification
- Domain: Eukaryota
- Kingdom: Animalia
- Phylum: Arthropoda
- Class: Insecta
- Order: Coleoptera
- Suborder: Polyphaga
- Infraorder: Cucujiformia
- Family: Curculionidae
- Genus: Minyomerus
- Species: M. microps

Binomial name
- Minyomerus microps (Say, 1831)

Synonyms
- Thylacites microsus Boheman, 1833

Species of beetle

Minyomerus microps is a species of broad-nosed weevil in the beetle family Curculionidae. It is found in North America.
