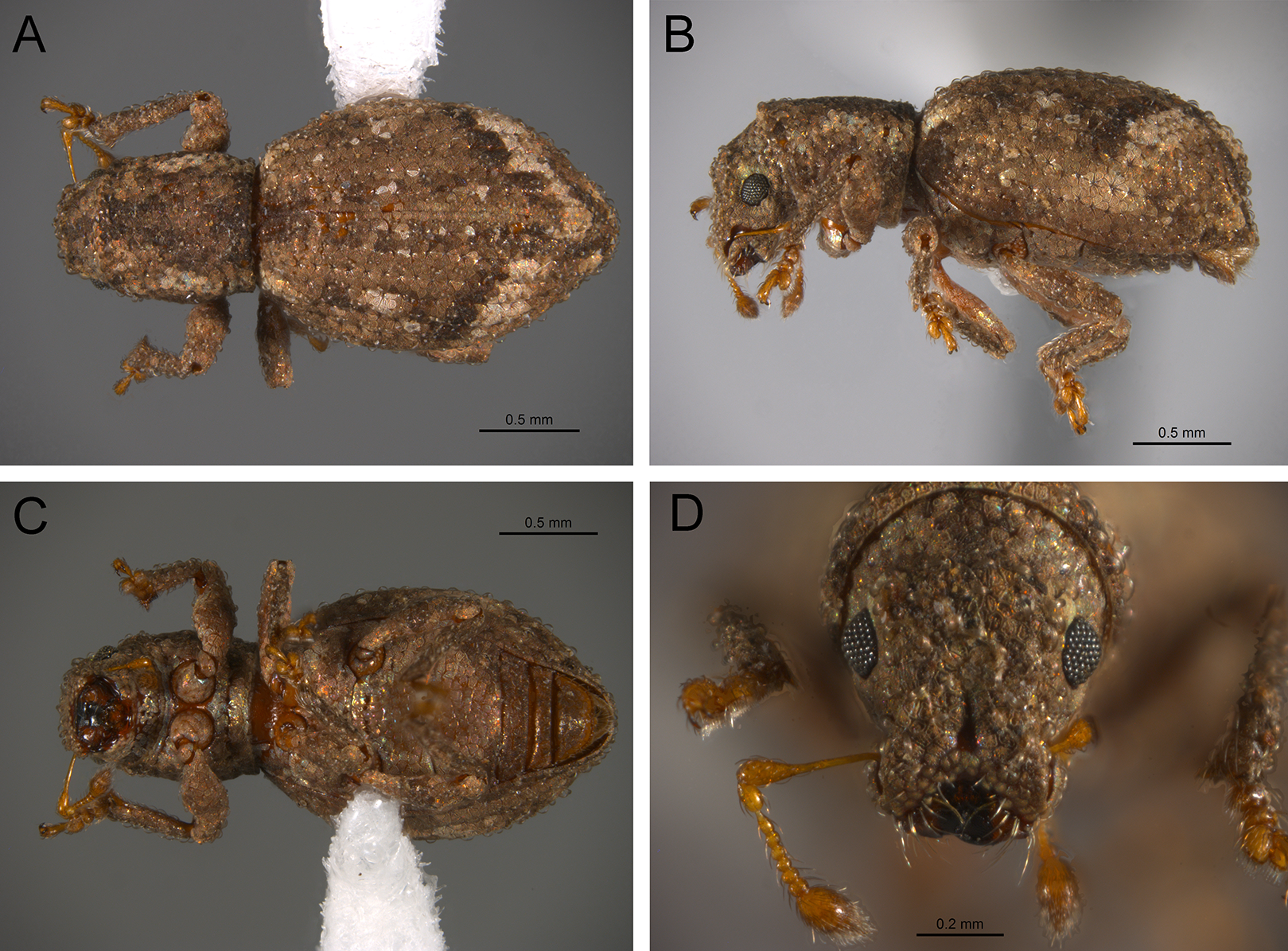
- Isodacrys frontalis

Scientific classification
- Kingdom: Animalia
- Phylum: Arthropoda
- Clade: Pancrustacea
- Class: Insecta
- Order: Coleoptera
- Suborder: Polyphaga
- Infraorder: Cucujiformia
- Superfamily: Curculionoidea
- Family: Curculionidae
- Tribe: Tanymecini
- Genus: Isodacrys; Sharp, 1911

Species
- 20 or 21 species (see text)

= Isodacrys =

Genus of beetles

Isodacrys is a genus of broad-nosed weevils in the beetle family Curculionidae. The genus is ranging from the southern United States of America to Honduras.

== Natural history ==
Isodacrys species are distributed from south of the United States of America to Honduras, mainly across Mexican and Central American mountain ranges of ~1500–3100 meters above sea level; some species also occur in lowlands. The adults of Isodacrys are flightless and have been found in Quercus, Pinus and in other plants of different families as Asteraceae, Fabaceae, Rhamnaceae, Cucurbitaceae, Betulaceae, Malvaceae, and Solanaceae. Some adults have been collected from leaf litter and under rocks. Immature stages remain unknown.

== Species ==
The Catalogue of Life recognizes 21 Isodacrys species:

- Isodacrys antrum Cortés-Hernández, 2020
- Isodacrys apicalis Howden, 1961
- Isodacrys brevirostris Howden, 1961
- Isodacrys buchanani Howden, 1961
- Isodacrys burkei Howden, 1961
- Isodacrys carlae Cortés-Hernández, 2020
- Isodacrys confusus Cortés-Hernández, 2020
- Isodacrys crispus Howden, 1961
- Isodacrys debilis Sharp, 1911
- Isodacrys ellipticus Howden, 1961
- Isodacrys fasciatus Cortés-Hernández, 2020
- Isodacrys frontalis Cortés-Hernández, 2020
- Isodacrys geminatus Howden, 1961
- Isodacrys guatemalenus Sharp, 1911
- Isodacrys kuchii Cortés-Hernández, 2020
- Isodacrys mexicanus Sharp, 1911
- Isodacrys obrienorum Cortés-Hernández, 2020
- Isodacrys okuiltontli Cortés-Hernández, 2020
- Isodacrys orizabae Sharp, 1911
- Isodacrys ovipennis (Schaffer, 1908)
- Isodacrys schwarzi Champion, 1911

Cortés-Hernández and Morrone (2020) list Isodacrys debilis Sharp, 1911 as Isodrusus debilis Sharp, 1911, a taxon that the Catalogue of Life self-inconsistently also accepts. The latter is the original combination.
