= Isodacrys burkei =

Scientific classification
- Kingdom: Animalia
- Phylum: Arthropoda
- Clade: Pancrustacea
- Class: Insecta
- Order: Coleoptera
- Suborder: Polyphaga
- Infraorder: Cucujiformia
- Family: Curculionidae
- Genus: Isodacrys
- Species: I. burkei

Binomial name
- Isodacrys burkei Howden, 1961

Species of beetle

Isodacrys burkei is a species of broad-nosed weevil in the beetle family Curculionidae. It is found in North America.
