= Pandeleteius cinereus =

Scientific classification
- Kingdom: Animalia
- Phylum: Arthropoda
- Clade: Pancrustacea
- Class: Insecta
- Order: Coleoptera
- Suborder: Polyphaga
- Infraorder: Cucujiformia
- Superfamily: Curculionoidea
- Family: Curculionidae
- Genus: Pandeleteius
- Species: P. cinereus

Binomial name
- Pandeleteius cinereus (Horn, 1876)

Species of beetle

Pandeleteius cinereus is a species of broad-nosed weevil in the beetle family Curculionidae. It is found in North America.
