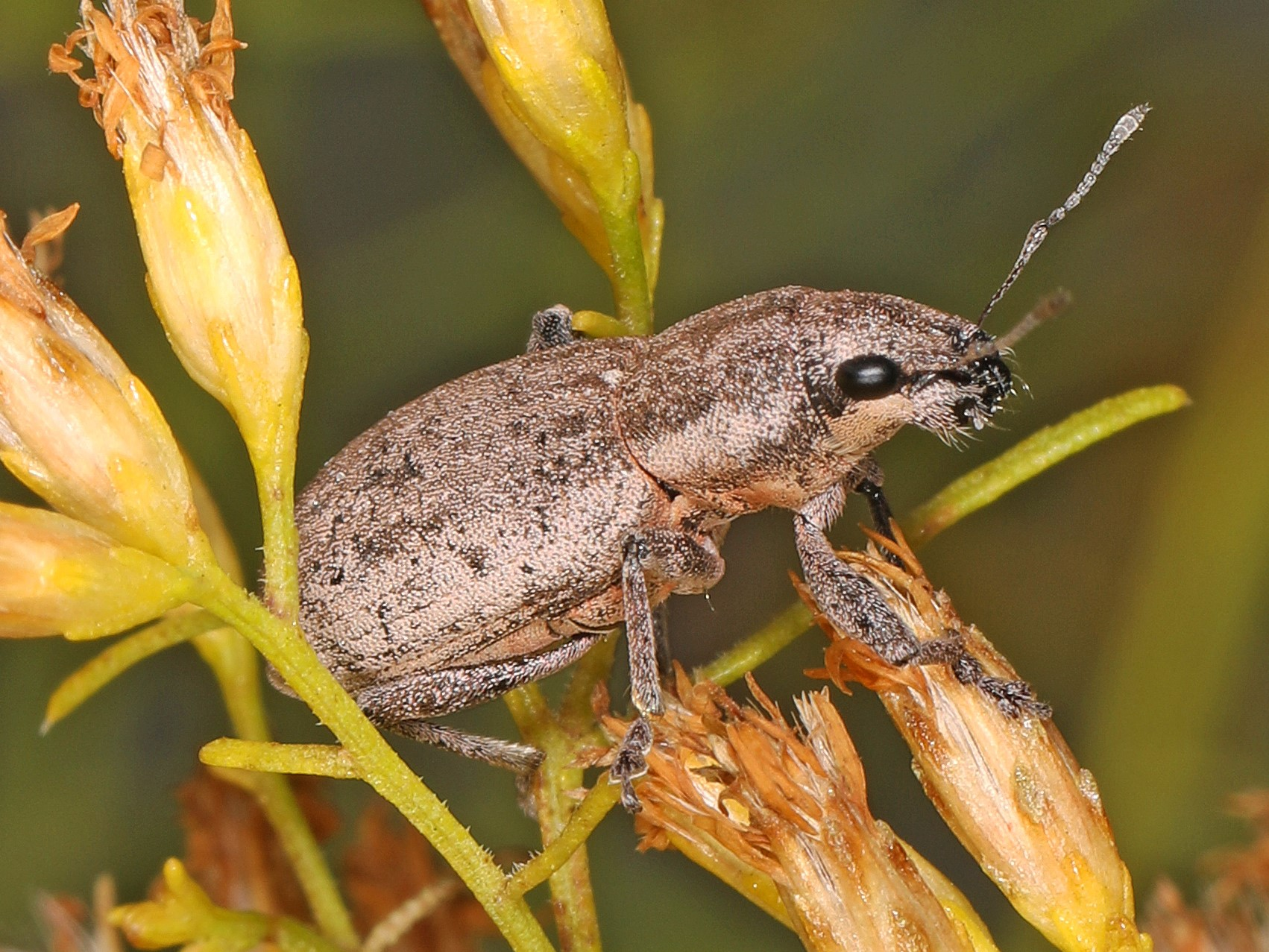

Scientific classification
- Kingdom: Animalia
- Phylum: Arthropoda
- Class: Insecta
- Order: Coleoptera
- Suborder: Polyphaga
- Infraorder: Cucujiformia
- Family: Curculionidae
- Genus: Tanymecus
- Species: T. lacaena

Binomial name
- Tanymecus lacaena (Herbst, 1797)

Synonyms
- Tanymecus canescens Gyllenhal, 1834; Tanymecus leucophaeus Gyllenhal, 1834

= Tanymecus lacaena =

Species of beetle

Tanymecus lacaena is a species of broad-nosed weevil in the beetle family Curculionidae. It is found in North America.
