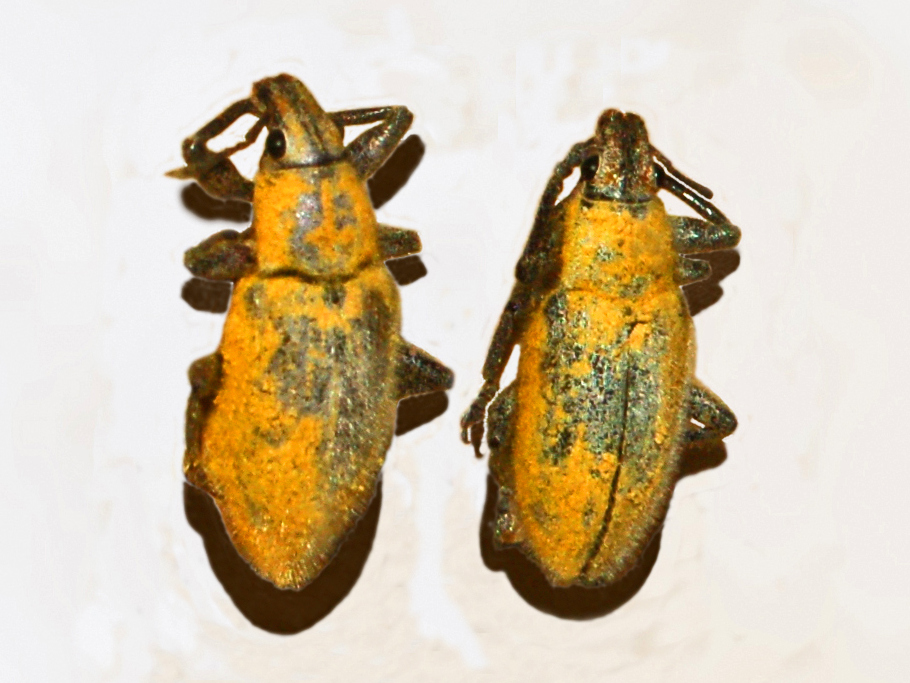
- Hypomeces rusticus from Timor. Mounted specimen

Scientific classification
- Kingdom: Animalia
- Phylum: Arthropoda
- Clade: Pancrustacea
- Class: Insecta
- Order: Coleoptera
- Suborder: Polyphaga
- Infraorder: Cucujiformia
- Family: Curculionidae
- Genus: Hypomeces
- Species: H. rusticus

Binomial name
- Hypomeces rusticus Schoenherr, 1840

= Hypomeces rusticus =

Species of beetle

Hypomeces rusticus is a species of the true weevil family.

== Description ==
Hypomeces rusticus can reach a length of about 15 millimetres (0.59 in). This species has an intense yellow pubescence all over the body. It is a polyphagous weevil feeding on the leaves of a wide variety of plants.

== Distribution ==
This species can be found in East India, Thailand, Laos, Java and Timor.
