= Sympiezomias kraatzi =

Scientific classification
- Kingdom: Animalia
- Phylum: Arthropoda
- Class: Insecta
- Order: Coleoptera
- Suborder: Polyphaga
- Infraorder: Cucujiformia
- Family: Curculionidae
- Genus: Sympiezomias
- Species: S. kraatzi

Binomial name
- Sympiezomias kraatzi Heller, 1901

Species of beetle

Sympiezomias kraatzi, is a species of weevil found in Sri Lanka.

== Description ==
This species has a body length is about 7 mm. Body black. Head and prothorax with small sparse brownish grey scales. Head rugosely punctate and somewhat striolate. Forehead unusually flattened. Antennae reddish brown. There is a broad lateral stripe of large greenish-yellow scales on pronotum. Prothorax longer than broad, with very strongly rounded sides. Elytra with dense brownish-grey scales. Ventrum with thin greyish scales. Elytra, subtruncate at the base. Legs reddish brown. Corbels in hind legs clothed with long dense golden setae.
