= Aspidiotes =

Scientific classification
- Kingdom: Animalia
- Phylum: Arthropoda
- Class: Insecta
- Order: Coleoptera
- Suborder: Polyphaga
- Infraorder: Cucujiformia
- Family: Curculionidae
- Subfamily: Entiminae
- Tribe: Tanymecini
- Subtribe: Tainophthalmina
- Genus: Aspidiotes; Schoenherr, 1847

Genus of weevils

Aspidiotes is a genus of weevils in the subtribe Tainophthalmina, described by Schönherr in 1847.
