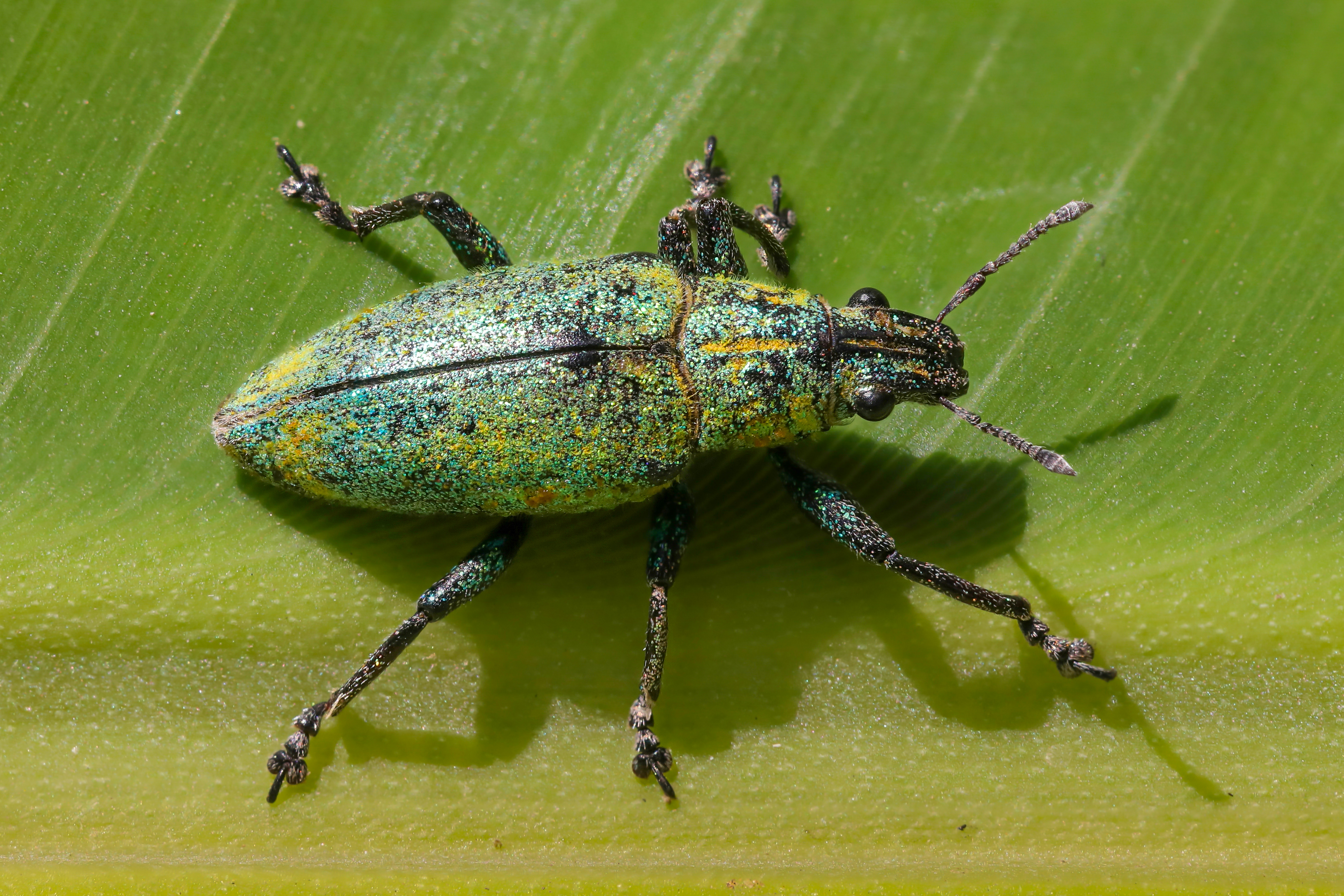
- Hypomeces squamosus on a leaf in Laos

Scientific classification
- Kingdom: Animalia
- Phylum: Arthropoda
- Clade: Pancrustacea
- Class: Insecta
- Order: Coleoptera
- Suborder: Polyphaga
- Infraorder: Cucujiformia
- Family: Curculionidae
- Genus: Hypomeces
- Species: H. pulviger

Binomial name
- Hypomeces pulviger (Herbst, 1795)

= Hypomeces pulviger =

Species of weevil

Hypomeces pulviger, also known as the gold-dust weevil or green weevil, is a species of beetle in the true weevil family. The adult weevil can reach a length of about 14 mm (0.6 in) and is covered with iridescent green or yellowish-green dust-like scales all over the body. This species can be found in India, tropical Southeast Asia, and the Philippines. Both the larvae and adults are crop pests. The larvae live in and pupate in the soil, feeding on living plant roots. The adult weevils are long-lived, doing damage to foliage, and sometimes defoliating young bushes and nursery trees.

== Description ==
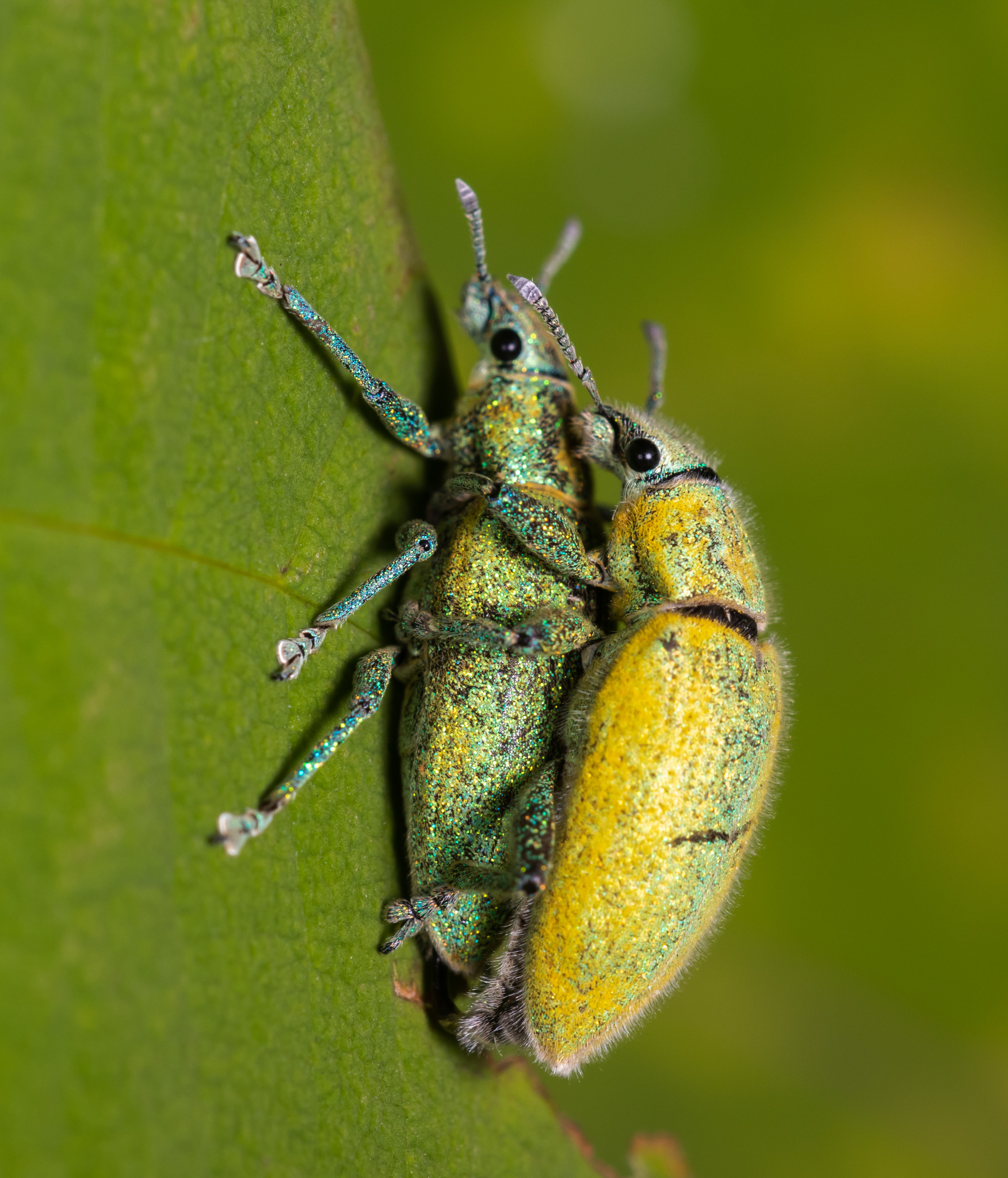
mating couple

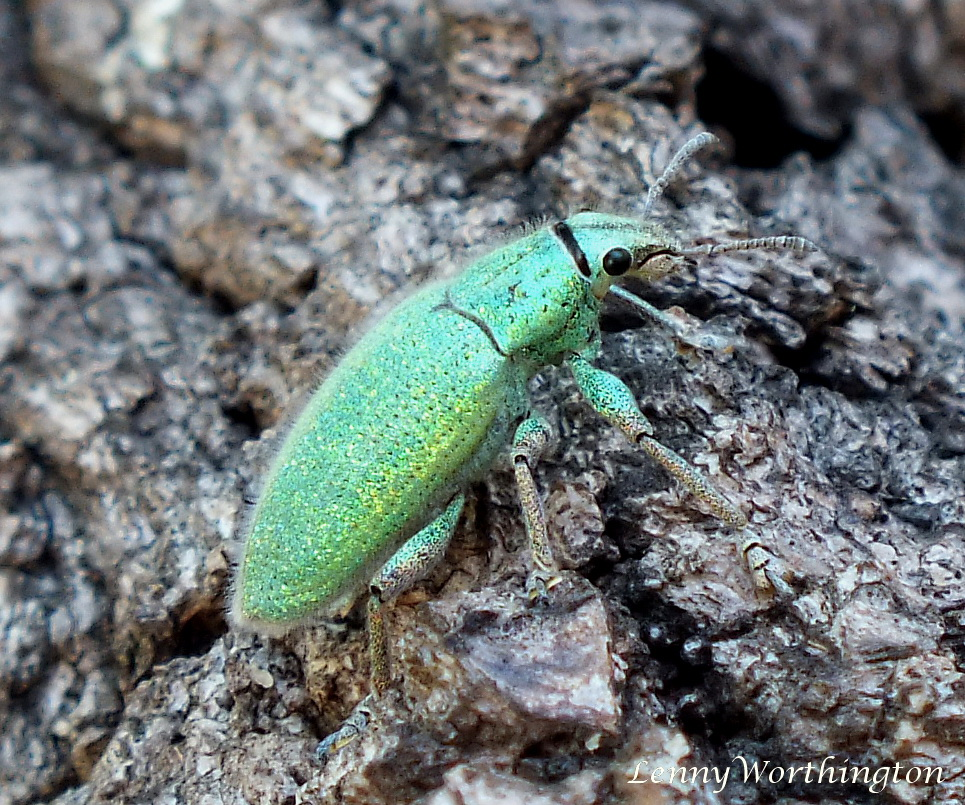
H. pulviger from Thailand

The adult beetle is about 14 mm (0.6 in) long. The head has a broad, long snout, clubbed antennae, large black eyes and chewing mouthparts. The thorax and elytra (wing cases) are grey, dusted with golden or greenish iridescent flattened setae. The larvae are legless grubs living in the soil.

== Distribution and habitat ==
Hypomeces pulviger is native to southeastern Asia, its range extending from Pakistan and India to Japan, Taiwan, the Philippines and Indonesia. The insects are found in forests and in more open areas including agricultural cropland.

== Damage ==
The larvae of Hypomeces pulviger live underground, feeding on the roots of a wide range of plants. In cotton and maize, they feed close to the surface and may cause the plants to lodge.

The adult Hypomeces pulviger feeds by chewing leaves. The growing tip and young leaves are preferentially chosen and eaten from the edge inwards. When older, more mature leaves are consumed, the softer parts between the veins are eaten and the veins are left.

Host plants include Citrus, Gossypium (cotton), Helianthus annuus (sunflower), Ipomoea batatas (sweet potato), Nicotiana tabacum (tobacco), Oryza sativa (rice), Persea americana (avocado), Saccharum officinarum (sugarcane) and Zea mays (maize).

It is a pest of tea plants in China, of red river gum (Eucalyptus camaldulensis) and pigeon pea (Cajanus cajan) in Thailand, of rubber (Hevea brasiliensis), cocoa (Theobroma cacao), cassia (Cassia fistula), cowpeas (Vigna unguiculata), jackfruit (Artocarpus heterophyllus), kapok (Bombax ceiba), breadfruit (Artocarpus altilis), Flindersia brayleyana, mangoes (Mangifera indica), mulberries (Morus alba), Philippine mahogany (Pterocarpus indicus), rambutan (Nephelium lappaceum), sapodilla (Manilkara zapota), teak (Tectona grandis) and tung (Vernicia fordii).

The weevils can also do considerable damage to young trees in forest nurseries.
