= Pandeleteinus =

Scientific classification
- Kingdom: Animalia
- Phylum: Arthropoda
- Class: Insecta
- Order: Coleoptera
- Suborder: Polyphaga
- Infraorder: Cucujiformia
- Family: Curculionidae
- Tribe: Tanymecini
- Genus: Pandeleteinus; Champion, 1911

Genus of beetles

Pandeleteinus is a genus of broad-nosed weevils in the beetle family Curculionidae. There are about five described species in Pandeleteinus.

== Species ==
These five species belong to the genus Pandeleteinus:

- Pandeleteinus elytroplanatus Howden, 1959^{i c g}
- Pandeleteinus lucidillus Howden, 1959^{i c g b}
- Pandeleteinus magdalenensis Howden, 1959^{c g}
- Pandeleteinus subcancer Howden, 1969^{c g}
- Pandeleteinus submetallicus (Schaeffer, 1908)^{i c g b}

Data sources: i = ITIS, c = Catalogue of Life, g = GBIF, b = Bugguide.net
