= Miloderoides =

Scientific classification
- Domain: Eukaryota
- Kingdom: Animalia
- Phylum: Arthropoda
- Class: Insecta
- Order: Coleoptera
- Suborder: Polyphaga
- Infraorder: Cucujiformia
- Family: Curculionidae
- Tribe: Tanymecini
- Genus: Miloderoides; Van Dyke, 1936

Genus of beetles

Miloderoides is a genus of broad-nosed weevils in the beetle family Curculionidae. There are at least three described species in Miloderoides.

== Species ==
These three species belong to the genus Miloderoides:

- Miloderoides cinereus (Van Dyke, 1935)^{i c g}
- Miloderoides maculatus Van Dyke, 1936^{i c g b}
- Miloderoides vandykei Tanner, 1942^{i c g}

Data sources: i = ITIS, c = Catalogue of Life, g = GBIF, b = Bugguide.net
