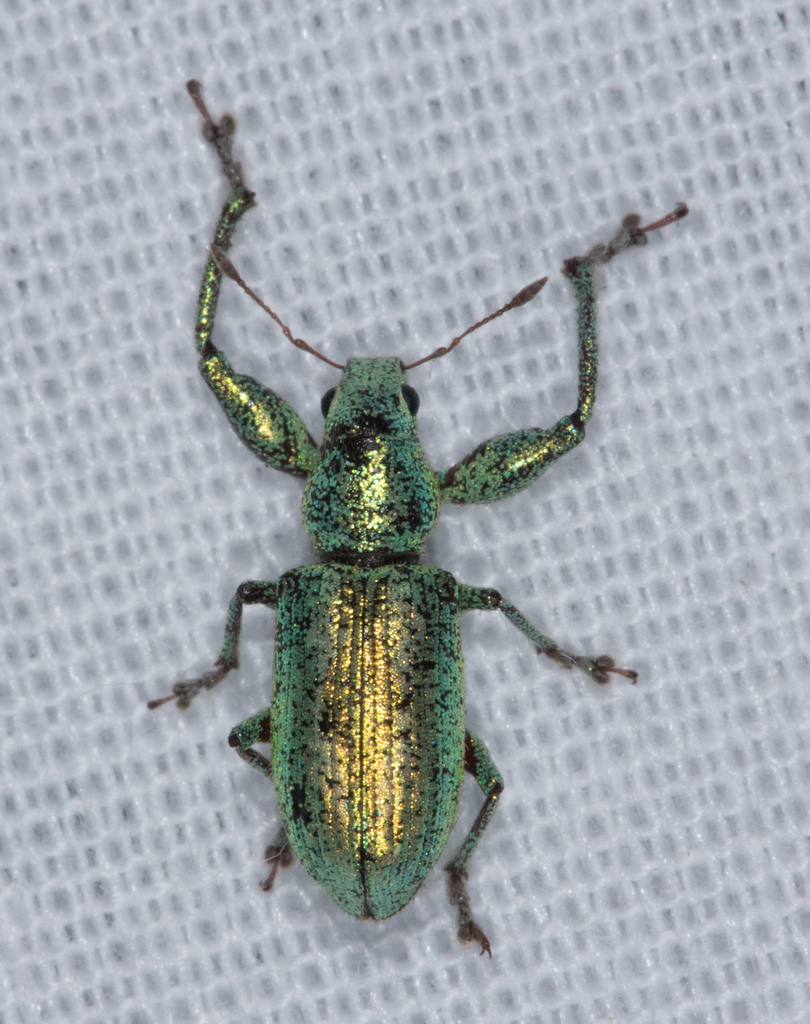
- Hadromeropsis opalina, dorsal view

Scientific classification
- Domain: Eukaryota
- Kingdom: Animalia
- Phylum: Arthropoda
- Class: Insecta
- Order: Coleoptera
- Suborder: Polyphaga
- Infraorder: Cucujiformia
- Family: Curculionidae
- Genus: Hadromeropsis
- Species: H. opalina

Binomial name
- Hadromeropsis opalina (Horn, 1876)

Synonyms
- Pandeleteius viridissimus Van Dyke, 1943

= Hadromeropsis opalina =

Species of beetle

Hadromeropsis opalina is a species of broad-nosed weevil in the beetle family Curculionidae. It is found in North America.
