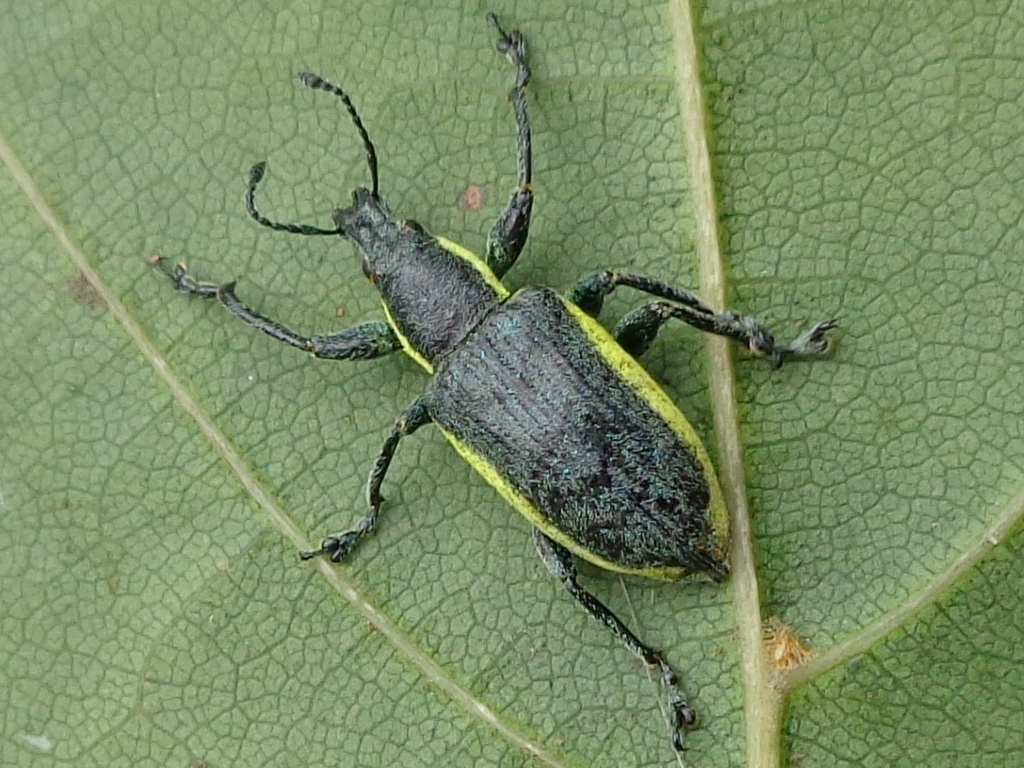
- Chlorophanus viridis

Scientific classification
- Kingdom: Animalia
- Phylum: Arthropoda
- Class: Insecta
- Order: Coleoptera
- Suborder: Polyphaga
- Infraorder: Cucujiformia
- Family: Curculionidae
- Tribe: Tanymecini
- Genus: Chlorophanus; Schönherr in Sahlberg, 1823

Synonyms
- Chlorima Germar, 1817; Parix Gistl, 1848; Phaenodes Schönherr, 1826; Phoenodus Schönherr, 1834

= Chlorophanus =

Genus of weevils

Chlorophanus is a genus of weevils in the subtribe Tanymecina, described by Schönherr (in Sahlberg) in 1823.

== Species ==
The following are included in BioLib.cz:

1. Chlorophanus caudatus Fåhraeus, 1840
2. Chlorophanus dorsiger Faust, 1897
3. Chlorophanus excisus (Fabricius, 1801)
4. Chlorophanus flavescens (Fabricius, 1787)
5. Chlorophanus gibbosus (Paykull, 1792)
6. Chlorophanus kubanensis Reitter, 1915
7. Chlorophanus micans Krynicki, 1832
8. Chlorophanus pollinosus (Fabricius, 1792)
9. Chlorophanus rugicollis Gyllenhal, 1834
10. Chlorophanus sellatus (Fabricius, 1798)
11. Chlorophanus sibiricus Gyllenhal, 1834
12. Chlorophanus viridis (Linnaeus, 1758)
13. Chlorophanus vittatus Schoenherr, 1832
14. Chlorophanus voluptificus Gyllenhal, 1834
