= Minyomerus =

Scientific classification
- Domain: Eukaryota
- Kingdom: Animalia
- Phylum: Arthropoda
- Class: Insecta
- Order: Coleoptera
- Suborder: Polyphaga
- Infraorder: Cucujiformia
- Family: Curculionidae
- Tribe: Tanymecini
- Genus: Minyomerus; Horn, 1876

Genus of beetles

Minyomerus is a genus of broad-nosed weevils in the beetle family Curculionidae. There are about 17 described species in Minyomerus.

== Species ==
These 17 species belong to the genus Minyomerus:

- Minyomerus aeriballux Jansen & Franz, 2015^{c g}
- Minyomerus bulbifrons Jansen & Franz, 2015^{c g}
- Minyomerus caseyi (Sharp, 1891)^{c g}
- Minyomerus conicollis Green, 1920^{i c g}
- Minyomerus constrictus (Casey, 1888)^{i c g}
- Minyomerus cracens Jansen & Franz, 2015^{c g}
- Minyomerus gravivultus Jansen & Franz, 2015^{c g}
- Minyomerus griseus (Sleeper, 1960)^{c g b}
- Minyomerus innocuus Horn, 1876^{i}
- Minyomerus languidus Horn, 1876^{i c g}
- Minyomerus laticeps (Casey, 1888)^{i c g b}
- Minyomerus microps (Say, 1831)^{i c g b}
- Minyomerus politus Jansen & Franz, 2015^{c g}
- Minyomerus puticulatus Jansen & Franz, 2015^{c g}
- Minyomerus reburrus Jansen & Franz, 2015^{c g}
- Minyomerus rutellirostris Jansen & Franz, 2015^{c g}
- Minyomerus trisetosus Jansen & Franz, 2015^{c g}

Data sources: i = ITIS, c = Catalogue of Life, g = GBIF, b = Bugguide.net
