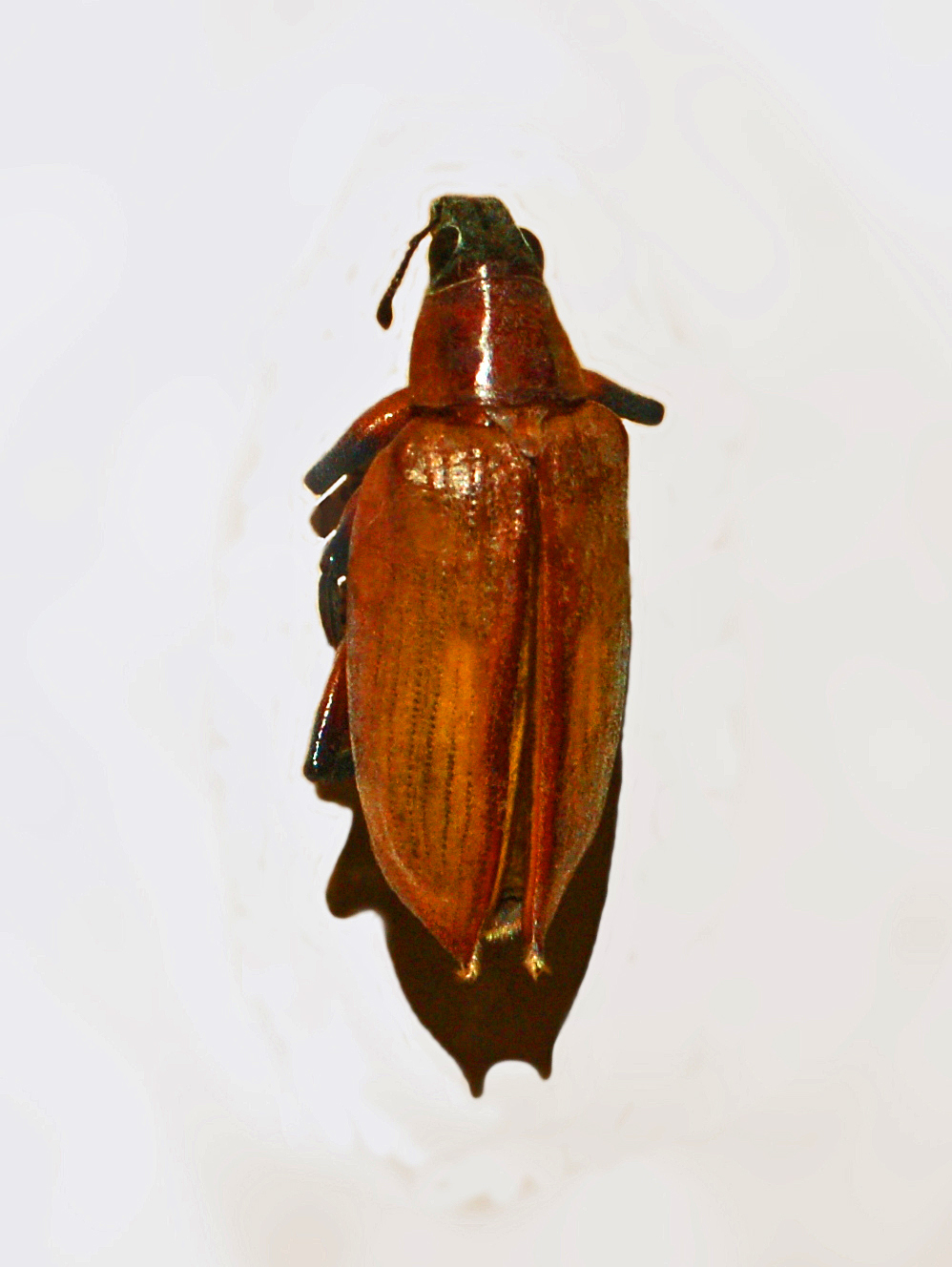
- Polyclaeis maculatus from Ethiopia. Mounted specimen

Scientific classification
- Kingdom: Animalia
- Phylum: Arthropoda
- Class: Insecta
- Order: Coleoptera
- Suborder: Polyphaga
- Infraorder: Cucujiformia
- Family: Curculionidae
- Genus: Polyclaeis
- Species: P. maculatus

Binomial name
- Polyclaeis maculatus Boheman, 1840

= Polyclaeis maculatus =

Species of beetle

Polyclaeis maculatus is a species of true weevil family.

== Distribution ==
This species can be found in Nubia (Sudan, Ethiopia).
