= Tanymecus curviscapus =

Scientific classification
- Kingdom: Animalia
- Phylum: Arthropoda
- Class: Insecta
- Order: Coleoptera
- Suborder: Polyphaga
- Infraorder: Cucujiformia
- Family: Curculionidae
- Genus: Tanymecus
- Species: T. curviscapus

Binomial name
- Tanymecus curviscapus Marshall, 1916

Species of beetle

Tanymecus curviscapus, is a species of weevil found in India and Sri Lanka.

== Description ==
This species has a body length is about 4.5 to 5 mm. Body black, with dense greyish-brown scales. Laterally, the prothorax is yellowish brown. Scutellum entirely whitish. Elytra clothed with a few whitish scales. Eyes are large, oval, moderately prominent. Rostrum broad, and very shallow apex. Antennae dark piceous, with moderately stout scape. In prothorax, there is a shallow constriction closer to the apex. Elytral interspaces with large shallow separated punctures and minute scattered punctures. Elytra comparatively broad with prominent shoulders. Legs with dense grey scales.
