= Pandeleteius robustus =

Scientific classification
- Domain: Eukaryota
- Kingdom: Animalia
- Phylum: Arthropoda
- Class: Insecta
- Order: Coleoptera
- Suborder: Polyphaga
- Infraorder: Cucujiformia
- Family: Curculionidae
- Genus: Pandeleteius
- Species: P. robustus

Binomial name
- Pandeleteius robustus (Schaeffer, 1908)

Species of beetle

Pandeleteius robustus is a species of broad-nosed weevil in the family Curculionidae. It is found in North America.
