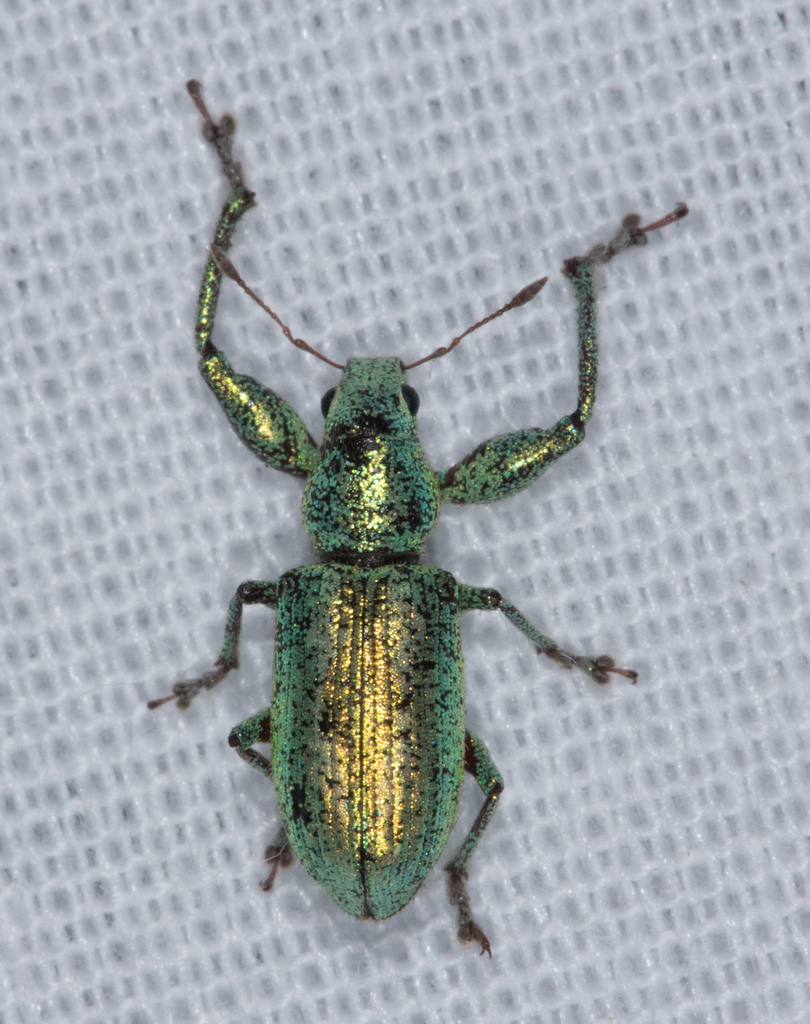

Scientific classification
- Domain: Eukaryota
- Kingdom: Animalia
- Phylum: Arthropoda
- Class: Insecta
- Order: Coleoptera
- Suborder: Polyphaga
- Infraorder: Cucujiformia
- Family: Curculionidae
- Tribe: Tanymecini
- Genus: Hadromeropsis; Pierce, 1913

= Hadromeropsis =

Genus of beetles

Hadromeropsis is a genus of broad-nosed weevils in the beetle family Curculionidae.

There are more than 50 described species in Hadromeropsis.

== Taxonomy ==
Hadromeropsis was described for the first time by W. Dwight Pierce in 1913 (p. 400). The Central American species were treated by Champion. The genus was revised by Anne Howden in 1982: It contains two subgenera: Hadromeropsis (Hadromeropsis) and Hadromeropsis (Hadrorestes).

== Description ==
Howden offered the following diagnosis for Hadromeropsis:

Small to large, 5 to 20 mm in length. Scales never sculptured. Posterior margin of epistoma never carinate or keeled, although margin elevated distally in a few species. Mandible with vestiture of lateral and ventral surface similar to that of rostrum. Pronotum never produced anteriorly over vertex. Female with caudal surface of ventrites 2, 3, and 4 conspicuously elevated, often perpendicular or slanted anteriorly or posteriorly, edge of caudal surface usually sharply delimited; character less developed in male.

— A.T. Howden, Revision of the New World genus Hadromeropsis Pierce (Coleoptera, Curculionidae, Tanymecini)

Howden indicates that the most similar genus to Hadromeropsis is the South American genus Macropterus.

== Distribution ==
The genus Hadromeropsis has been recorded from Argentina, Bolivia, Brazil, Colombia, Ecuador, Paraguay, Peru, Uruguay, Venezuela, Costa Rica, Guatemala, Mexico, and Panama.

== Species ==
These 53 species belong to the genus Hadromeropsis:

- Hadromeropsis alacer Howden, 1982
- Hadromeropsis amoena Howden, 1982
- Hadromeropsis annae Anderson, 2008
- Hadromeropsis apicalis Howden, 1982
- Hadromeropsis argentinensis (Hustache, 1926)
- Hadromeropsis atomaria Boheman, 1840
- Hadromeropsis aurea Boheman, 1847
- Hadromeropsis batesi Howden, 1982
- Hadromeropsis beverlyae Howden, 1982
- Hadromeropsis bombycina Howden, 1982
- Hadromeropsis brachyptera Howden, 1982
- Hadromeropsis brevicoma Howden, 1982
- Hadromeropsis cavifrons Howden, 1982
- Hadromeropsis conquisita Howden, 1982
- Hadromeropsis contracta Howden, 1982
- Hadromeropsis cretata Champion, 1911
- Hadromeropsis crinita Howden, 1982
- Hadromeropsis dejeanii Boheman, 1840
- Hadromeropsis dialeuca Howden, 1982
- Hadromeropsis earina Howden, 1982
- Hadromeropsis excubitor Howden, 1982
- Hadromeropsis exilis Howden, 1982
- Hadromeropsis fasciata Lucas, 1857
- Hadromeropsis fulgens Champion, 1911
- Hadromeropsis gemmifera Boheman, 1845
- Hadromeropsis impressicollis Kirsch, 1868
- Hadromeropsis inconscripta Howden, 1982
- Hadromeropsis institula Howden, 1982
- Hadromeropsis jugellata Howden, 1982
- Hadromeropsis magica Pascoe, 1881
- Hadromeropsis merzdiana Howden, 1982
- Hadromeropsis micans Champion, 1911
- Hadromeropsis nana Howden, 1982
- Hadromeropsis nebulicola Howden, 1982
- Hadromeropsis nitida Howden, 1982
- Hadromeropsis nobilitata Gyllenhal, 1834
- Hadromeropsis opalina (Horn, 1876)
- Hadromeropsis pallida Howden, 1982
- Hadromeropsis pectinata Howden, 1982
- Hadromeropsis picchuensis Howden, 1982
- Hadromeropsis plebeia Howden, 1982
- Hadromeropsis pulverulenta Howden, 1982
- Hadromeropsis rnandibularis Howden, 1982
- Hadromeropsis rufipes Champion, 1911
- Hadromeropsis scamba Howden, 1982
- Hadromeropsis scintillans Champion, 1911
- Hadromeropsis silacea Howden, 1982
- Hadromeropsis speculifera Howden, 1982
- Hadromeropsis spiculata Howden, 1982
- Hadromeropsis striata Howden, 1982
- Hadromeropsis superba Heller, 1921
- Hadromeropsis togata Boheman, 1840
- Hadromeropsis transandina Howden, 1982
