= Tanymecus texanus =

Scientific classification
- Domain: Eukaryota
- Kingdom: Animalia
- Phylum: Arthropoda
- Class: Insecta
- Order: Coleoptera
- Suborder: Polyphaga
- Infraorder: Cucujiformia
- Family: Curculionidae
- Genus: Tanymecus
- Species: T. texanus

Binomial name
- Tanymecus texanus Van Dyke, 1935

Species of beetle

Tanymecus texanus is a species of broad-nosed weevil in the beetle family Curculionidae. It is found in North America.
