= Amotus setulosus =

Scientific classification
- Domain: Eukaryota
- Kingdom: Animalia
- Phylum: Arthropoda
- Class: Insecta
- Order: Coleoptera
- Suborder: Polyphaga
- Infraorder: Cucujiformia
- Family: Curculionidae
- Genus: Amotus
- Species: A. setulosus

Binomial name
- Amotus setulosus (Schönherr, 1847)

Synonyms
- Amotus gracilior Casey, 1888; Amotus longisternus Casey, 1888

Species of weevil beetle

Amotus setulosus is a species of broad-nosed weevil in the beetle family Curculionidae. It is found in North America.
