= Amotus =

Scientific classification
- Kingdom: Animalia
- Phylum: Arthropoda
- Class: Insecta
- Order: Coleoptera
- Suborder: Polyphaga
- Infraorder: Cucujiformia
- Family: Curculionidae
- Tribe: Tanymecini
- Genus: Amotus; Casey, 1888

Genus of beetles

Amotus is a genus of broad-nosed weevils in the beetle family Curculionidae. There are at least three described species in Amotus.

== Species ==
These three species belong to the genus Amotus:

- Amotus longipennis Pierce, 1909^{i c g}
- Amotus seniculus (Horn, 1876)^{i c g}
- Amotus setulosus (Schönherr, 1847)^{i c g b}

Data sources: i = ITIS, c = Catalogue of Life, g = GBIF, b = Bugguide.net
