= Trigonoscutoides =

Scientific classification
- Domain: Eukaryota
- Kingdom: Animalia
- Phylum: Arthropoda
- Class: Insecta
- Order: Coleoptera
- Suborder: Polyphaga
- Infraorder: Cucujiformia
- Family: Curculionidae
- Tribe: Tanymecini
- Genus: Trigonoscutoides; O'Brien, 1977

Genus of beetles

Trigonoscutoides is a genus of broad-nosed weevils in the beetle family Curculionidae. There is at least one described species in Trigonoscutoides, T. texanus.
