= Pandeleteius nodifer =

Scientific classification
- Domain: Eukaryota
- Kingdom: Animalia
- Phylum: Arthropoda
- Class: Insecta
- Order: Coleoptera
- Suborder: Polyphaga
- Infraorder: Cucujiformia
- Family: Curculionidae
- Genus: Pandeleteius
- Species: P. nodifer

Binomial name
- Pandeleteius nodifer Champion, 1911

Species of beetle

Pandeleteius nodifer is a species of broad-nosed weevil in the beetle family Curculionidae. It is found in North America.
