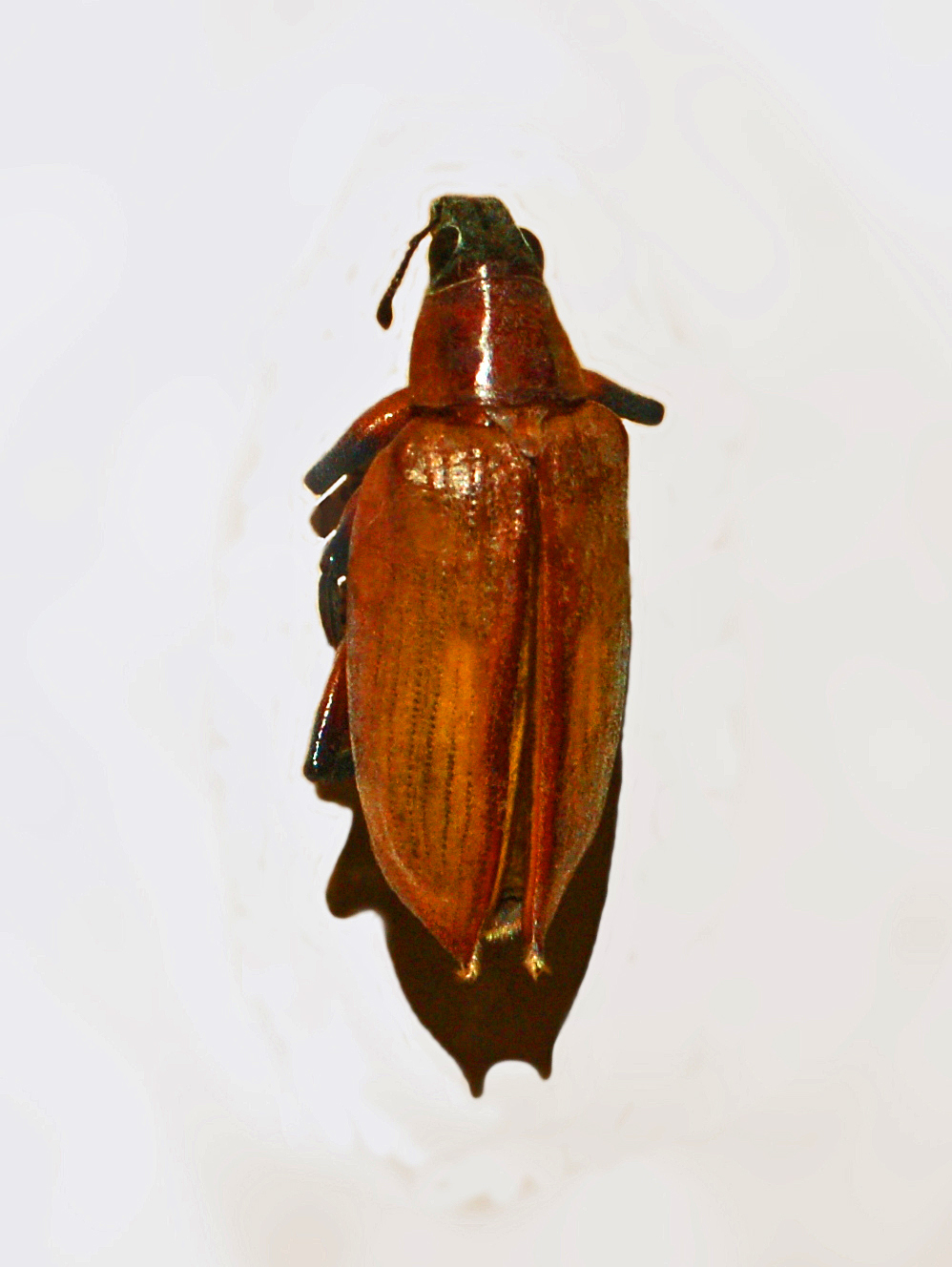
- Polyclaeis maculatus from Ethiopia. Mounted specimen

Scientific classification
- Kingdom: Animalia
- Phylum: Arthropoda
- Class: Insecta
- Order: Coleoptera
- Suborder: Polyphaga
- Infraorder: Cucujiformia
- Family: Curculionidae
- Subfamily: Entiminae
- Tribe: Tanymecini
- Subtribe: Piazomiina
- Genus: Polyclaeis; Boheman, 1840

= Polyclaeis =

Genus of beetles

Polyclaeis is a genus of the true weevil family.

== List of species ==
- Polyclaeis africanus
- Polyclaeis albicans
- Polyclaeis albidopictus
- Polyclaeis angusticollis
- Polyclaeis atomarius
- Polyclaeis auriventris
- Polyclaeis barbicauda
- Polyclaeis bohemani
- Polyclaeis castaneipennis
- Polyclaeis cinereus
- Polyclaeis cribrosus
- Polyclaeis curvispinis
- Polyclaeis decorus
- Polyclaeis despectus
- Polyclaeis difficilis
- Polyclaeis diffusus
- Polyclaeis equestris
- Polyclaeis krokisi
- Polyclaeis livingstoni
- Polyclaeis longicornis
- Polyclaeis maculatus
- Polyclaeis maculifer
- Polyclaeis mellyi
- Polyclaeis nobilitatus
- Polyclaeis obliteratus
- Polyclaeis ocellatus
- Polyclaeis octomaculatus
- Polyclaeis octoplagiatus
- Polyclaeis opacus
- Polyclaeis ornatissimus
- Polyclaeis parcus
- Polyclaeis patrizii
- Polyclaeis pilipes
- Polyclaeis plagiatus
- Polyclaeis plumbeus
- Polyclaeis prasinus
- Polyclaeis raffrayi
- Polyclaeis relegandus
- Polyclaeis rugosus
- Polyclaeis scotti
- Polyclaeis signatus
- Polyclaeis squamuliventris
- Polyclaeis striatus
- Polyclaeis stuhlmanni
- Polyclaeis sulphureus
- Polyclaeis sumptuosus
- Polyclaeis suturatus
- Polyclaeis trapezicollis
- Polyclaeis uniformis
- Polyclaeis variegatus
- Polyclaeis vestitus
- Polyclaeis viridanus
- Polyclaeis vittatus
- Polyclaeis wittei
