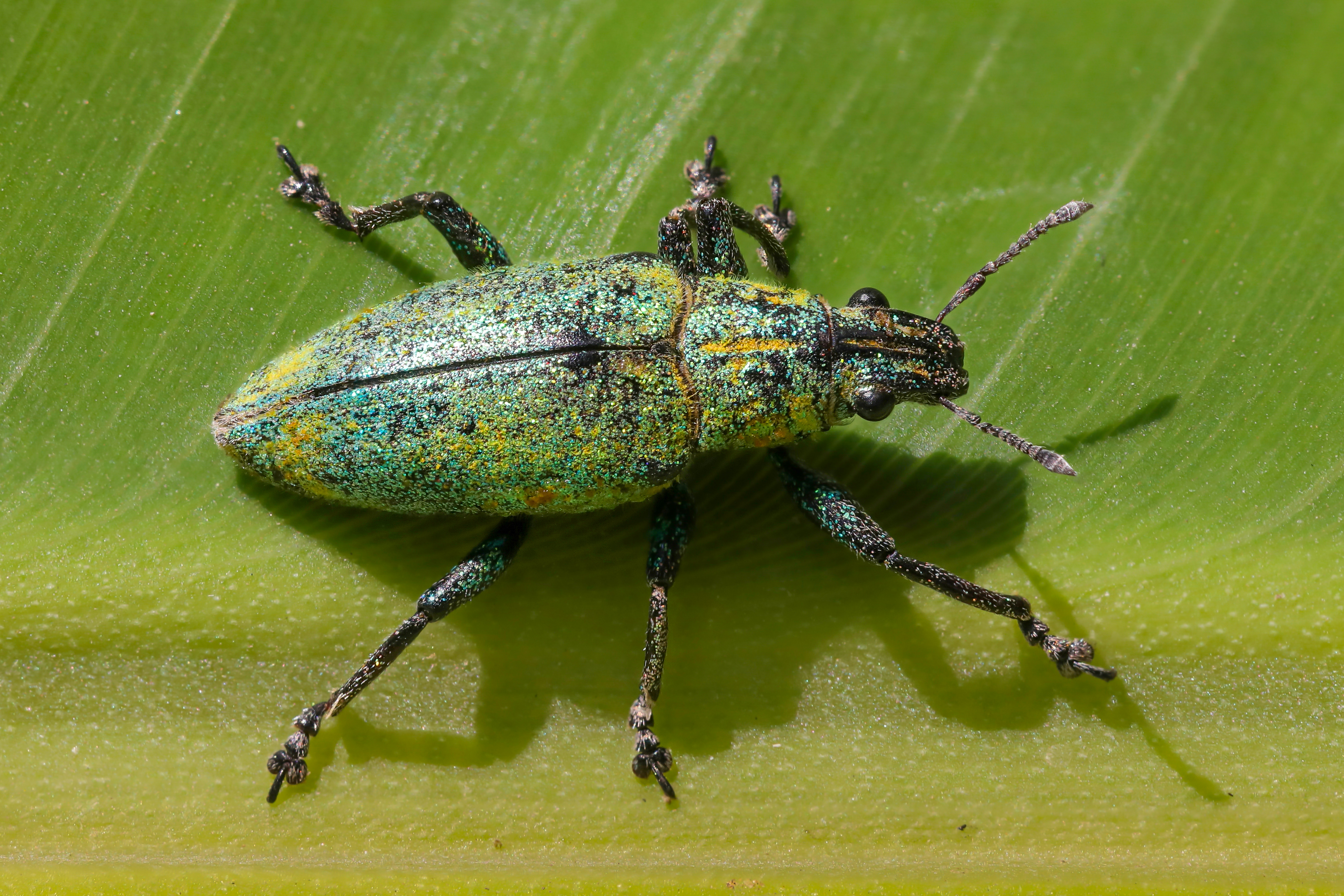
- Hypomeces squamosus from Laos

Scientific classification
- Kingdom: Animalia
- Phylum: Arthropoda
- Class: Insecta
- Order: Coleoptera
- Suborder: Polyphaga
- Infraorder: Cucujiformia
- Family: Curculionidae
- Subfamily: Entiminae
- Tribe: Tanymecini
- Subtribe: Piazomiina
- Genus: Hypomeces; Schoenherr, 1823

= Hypomeces =

Genus of beetles

Hypomeces is a tropical genus of true weevil family.

== List of selected species ==
This genus comprise more than 50 species:

- Hypomeces atomarius
- Hypomeces auricephalus
- Hypomeces aurulentus
- Hypomeces bernieri
- Hypomeces cinctus
- Hypomeces confossus
- Hypomeces curtus
- Hypomeces denticollis
- Hypomeces dispar
- Hypomeces fabricii
- Hypomeces gossipi
- Hypomeces guttulatus
- Hypomeces impressicollis
- Hypomeces inflatus
- Hypomeces laniger
- Hypomeces lanuginosus
- Hypomeces lynceus
- Hypomeces marginellus
- Hypomeces modestus
- Hypomeces orientalis
- Hypomeces pauper
- Hypomeces peregrinus
- Hypomeces pollinosus
- Hypomeces pulverulentus
- Hypomeces pulviger
- Hypomeces rusticus
- Hypomeces sparsus
- Hypomeces suturalis
- Hypomeces tibialis
- Hypomeces timorensis
- Hypomeces unicolor
- Hypomeces villosus
