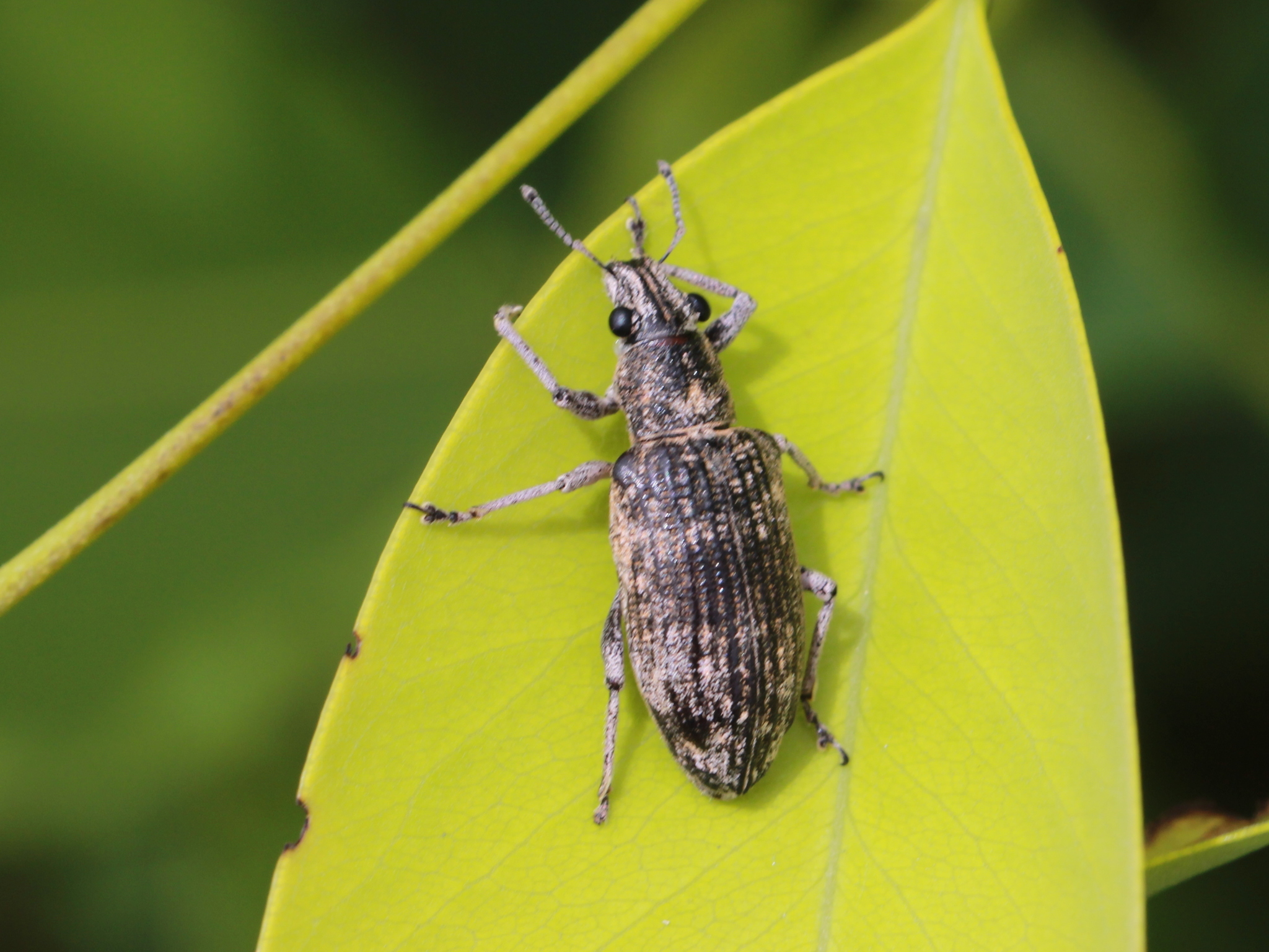
- In India

Scientific classification
- Kingdom: Animalia
- Phylum: Arthropoda
- Clade: Pancrustacea
- Class: Insecta
- Order: Coleoptera
- Suborder: Polyphaga
- Infraorder: Cucujiformia
- Superfamily: Curculionoidea
- Family: Curculionidae
- Tribe: Tanymecini
- Subtribe: Piazomiina
- Genus: Dereodus; Schönherr, 1823

Type species
- Dereodus denticollis Boh.

Diversity
- About 25 species

Synonyms
- Catponus Desbrochers, 1891; Darcodus Faust, 1899; Grypnus Desbrochers, 1892

= Dereodus =

Genus of beetles

Dereodus is a genus of beetles belonging to the family Curculionidae. Species are distributed throughout India, Sri Lanka, Middle East, Africa and introduced to Australia.

== Description ==
Very similar to the genus Hypomeces. Structure of the eyes is very variable. In male, antennae with joint 7 of the funicle always longer than 6. Prothorax base is either slightly bisinuate or truncate. Sternum without any bifid tubercular prominence behind the anterior coxae. Legs with tarsi varying in width where the trochanters are without the solitary long bristle.

Many species are known to damage leaves of Vachellia nilotica.

== Species ==
- Subgenus Cataponus Desbrochers des Loges, 1891
  - Dereodus curtulus (Desbrochers des Loges, 1891)
  - Dereodus marginellus (Boheman, 1834)
- Subgenus Dereodus (sensu stricto)
  - Dereodus albofasciatus Magnano, 2009
  - Dereodus andamanensis Marshall, 1916
  - Dereodus curtus (Boheman, 1840)
  - Dereodus cylindricollis Gestro, 1892
  - Dereodus denticollis Boheman, 1834
  - Dereodus elegantulus Hustache, 1924
  - Dereodus elongatus Gestro, 1892
  - Dereodus macularius (Pascoe, 1883)
  - Dereodus mastos (Herbst, 1797)
  - Dereodus mesopotamicus (Pic, 1896)
  - Dereodus pauper Dalman, 1834
  - Dereodus phasianellus Fairmaire, 1886
  - Dereodus pollinosus Redtenbacher, 1844
  - Dereodus pulverosus Marshall, 1916
  - Dereodus recticollis Marshall, 1909
  - Dereodus schoenherri Faust, 1885
  - Dereodus sitonoides (Pic, 1896)
  - Dereodus sparsus Boheman, 1840
  - Dereodus striatopunctatus Fairmaire, 1887
  - Dereodus subroseus Faust, 1895
  - Dereodus trisulcatus (Voss, 1922)
  - Dereodus uhlenhethi Hustache, 1936
  - Dereodus vagabundus Faust, 1885
  - Dereodus vigilans Marshall, 1916
