= Tanymecus indicus =

Scientific classification
- Kingdom: Animalia
- Phylum: Arthropoda
- Class: Insecta
- Order: Coleoptera
- Suborder: Polyphaga
- Infraorder: Cucujiformia
- Family: Curculionidae
- Genus: Tanymecus
- Species: T. indicus

Binomial name
- Tanymecus indicus Faust, 1895

Species of beetle

Tanymecus indicus is a species of weevil. It is a pest of millets such as pearl millet and sorghum in India.
