= Minyomerus laticeps =

Scientific classification
- Kingdom: Animalia
- Phylum: Arthropoda
- Class: Insecta
- Order: Coleoptera
- Suborder: Polyphaga
- Infraorder: Cucujiformia
- Family: Curculionidae
- Genus: Minyomerus
- Species: M. laticeps

Binomial name
- Minyomerus laticeps (Casey, 1888)

Species of beetle

Minyomerus laticeps is a species of broad-nosed weevil in the beetle family Curculionidae. It is found in North America.
