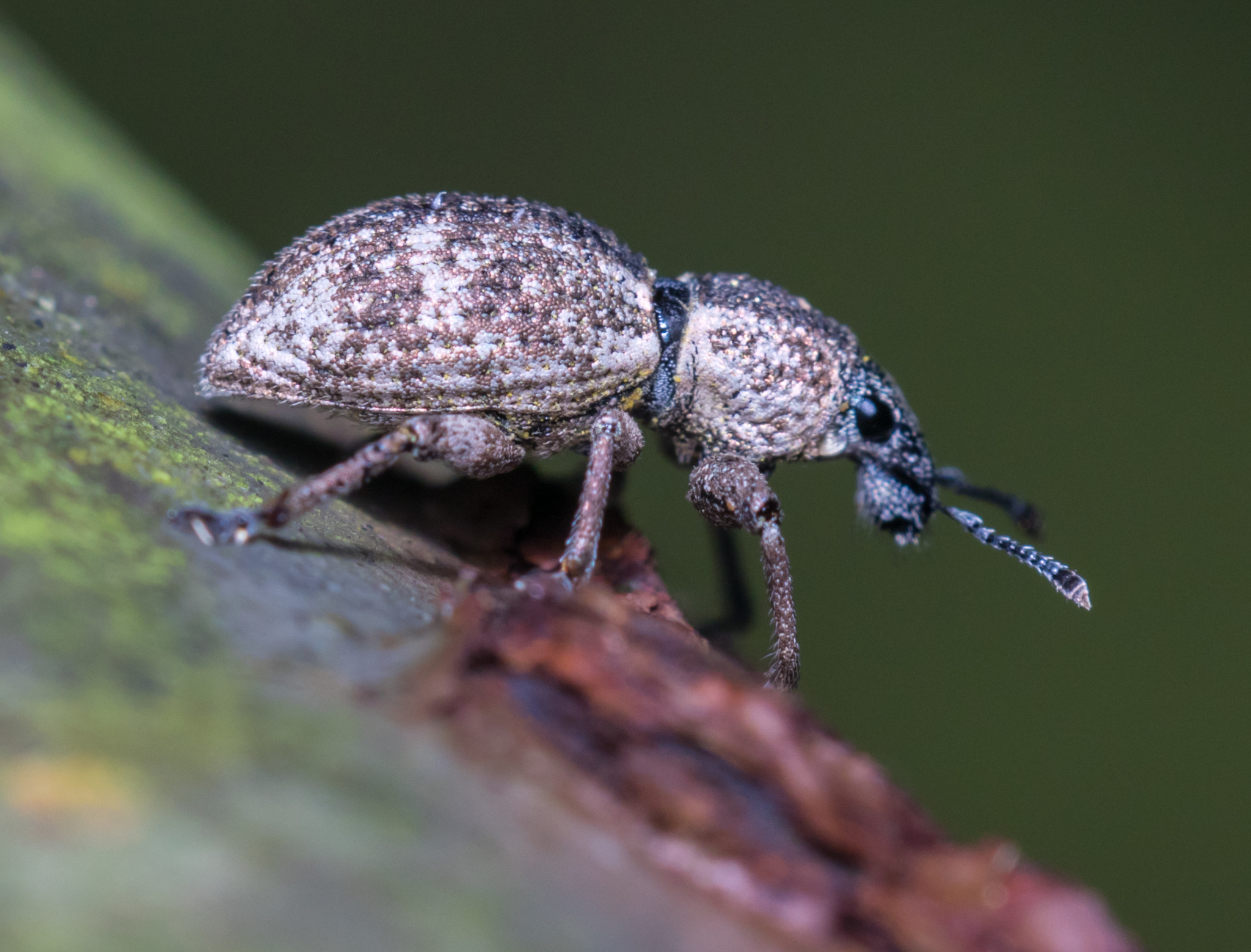
- Sympiezomias citri

Scientific classification
- Domain: Eukaryota
- Kingdom: Animalia
- Phylum: Arthropoda
- Class: Insecta
- Order: Coleoptera
- Suborder: Polyphaga
- Infraorder: Cucujiformia
- Family: Curculionidae
- Genus: Sympiezomias; Faust, 1887

Type species
- Brachyaspistes velatus Chev.

Species
- See text

Diversity
- About 37 species

Synonyms
- Piazomias (part.), Lacordaire, 1863

= Sympiezomias =

Genus of beetles

Sympiezomias is a genus of beetles belonging to the family Curculionidae. Species are distributed throughout India, Sri Lanka, Myanmar, Malaysia, Thailand, China and Japan. Almost all species are very uniform in external structures which leads to misidentification.

== Description ==
Eyes lateral, broadly oval and moderately prominent. Rostrum longer than the head. In antennae, scape hardly exceeding the middle of the eye. Scape cylindrical, with slender base. Prothorax truncate at base and apex. Scutellum small. Elytra ovate, and narrowly marginate at the base. True shoulders are absent in elytra. Sternum with the narrow mesosternal epimera. Episterna narrow. Venter with rounded or subtruncate intercoxal process. In legs, femora clavate and front tibiae longer than the others.

== Species ==
- Sympiezomias acutipennis (Boheman, 1845)
- Sympiezomias anamalainus Marshall, 1916
- Sympiezomias basalis Aurivillius, 1892
- Sympiezomias boesoni Marshall, 1921
- Sympiezomias chenggongensis Chao, 1977
- Sympiezomias cicatricollis Voss, 1932
- Sympiezomias citri Chao, 1977
- Sympiezomias clams Chao, 1977
- Sympiezomias cretaceus Faust, 1897
- Sympiezomias cribricollis Kono, 1930
- Sympiezomias cupreovirens Marshall, 1918
- Sympiezomias decipiens Marshall, 1916
- Sympiezomias elongatus Chao, 1977
- Sympiezomias frater Marshall, 1916
- Sympiezomias gemmius Zhang, 1992
- Sympiezomias guangxiensis Chao, 1977
- Sympiezomias herzi Faust, 1887
- Sympiezomias hispidus Marshall, 1916
- Sympiezomias inflatus Faust, 1895
- Sympiezomias kraatzi Heller, 1901
- Sympiezomias lewisi (Roelofs, 1879)
- Sympiezomias lividus Marshall, 1916
- Sympiezomias menglongensis Chao, 1977
- Sympiezomias menzhehensis Chao, 1977
- Sympiezomias peroteti (Boheman, 1845)
- Sympiezomias praeteritus Marshall, 1916
- Sympiezomias serratipes Marshall, 1916
- Sympiezomias setosus Aurivillius, 1892
- Sympiezomias shanensis Marshall, 1941
- Sympiezomias shanghaiensis Chao, 1977
- Sympiezomias subserratipes Ramamurthy, 2010
- Sympiezomias subvirens Marshall, 1941
- Sympiezomias sulcicollis Faust, 1895
- Sympiezomias sulphuratus Marshall, 1916
- Sympiezomias unicolor Chao, 1977
- Sympiezomias variabilis Voss, 1932
- Sympiezomias velatus (Chevrolat, 1845)
