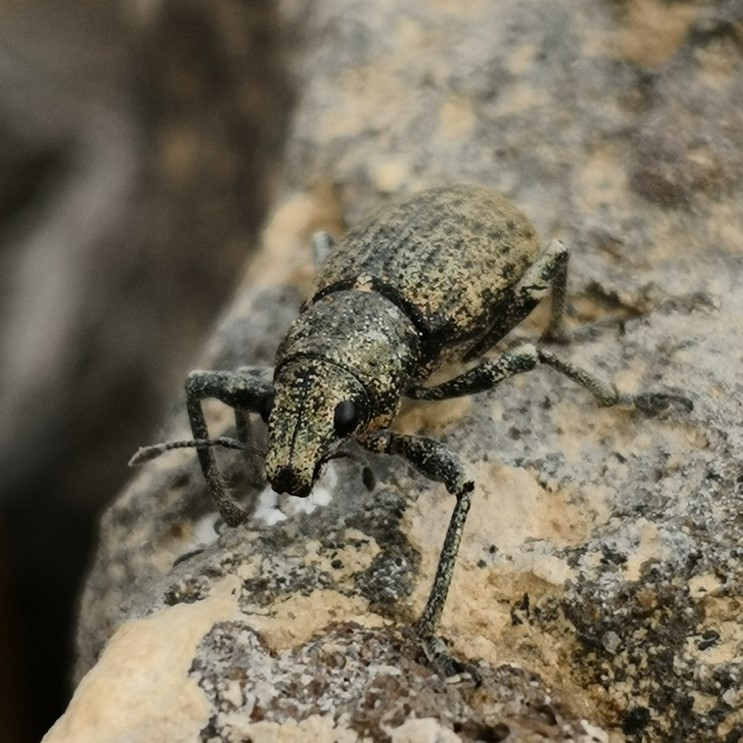
- Herpisticus subvestitus

Scientific classification
- Kingdom: Animalia
- Phylum: Arthropoda
- Class: Insecta
- Order: Coleoptera
- Suborder: Polyphaga
- Infraorder: Cucujiformia
- Family: Curculionidae
- Subfamily: Entiminae
- Tribe: Tanymecini; Lacordaire, 1863

= Tanymecini =

Tribe of beetles

Tanymecini is a tribe of broad-nosed weevils in the beetle family Curculionidae, subfamily Entiminae.

== Subtribes and genera ==
=== Piazomiina ===
1. Achlainomus G. R. Waterhouse, 1853
2. Aphaeromias Nasreddinov, 1978
3. Atmetonychus Schönherr, 1840
4. Dereodus Schönherr, 1823
5. Dyscheres Pascoe, 1883
6. Farsomias G.A.K. Marshall, 1944
7. Geotragus Schönherr, 1845
8. Herpisticus Germar, 1823
9. Hyperomias G.A.K. Marshall, 1916
10. Hypomeces Schönherr, 1823
11. Indomias G.A.K. Marshall, 1941
12. Kirgisomias Bajtenov, 1974
13. Lepidospyris G.A.K. Marshall, 1916
14. Lepropus Schönherr, 1823
15. Leptomias Faust, 1886
16. Meteutinopus Zumpt, 1931
17. Molybdotus Fairmaire, 1882
18. Odontomias Y-Q. Chen, 1991
19. Orthomias Faust, 1885
20. Pachynotus Kollar & L. Redtenbacher, 1844
21. Parageotragus Magnano, 2009
22. Piazomias Schönherr, 1840
23. Polyclaeis Boheman, 1840
24. Strophosomoides Aslam, 1966
25. Sympiezomias Faust, 1887
26. Triangulomias Y-Q. Chen, 1991
27. Xizanomias Chao, 1980
28. Xylinophorus Faust, 1885

=== Tainophthalmina ===
1. Amomphus Schönherr, 1848
2. Amystax Roelofs, 1873
3. Aspidiotes Schönherr, 1847
4. Enaptorhinus G. R. Waterhouse, 1853
5. Lechrioderus Faust, 1890
6. Psalidimomphus Reitter, 1913
7. Tainophthalmus Desbrochers, 1873

=== Tanymecina ===
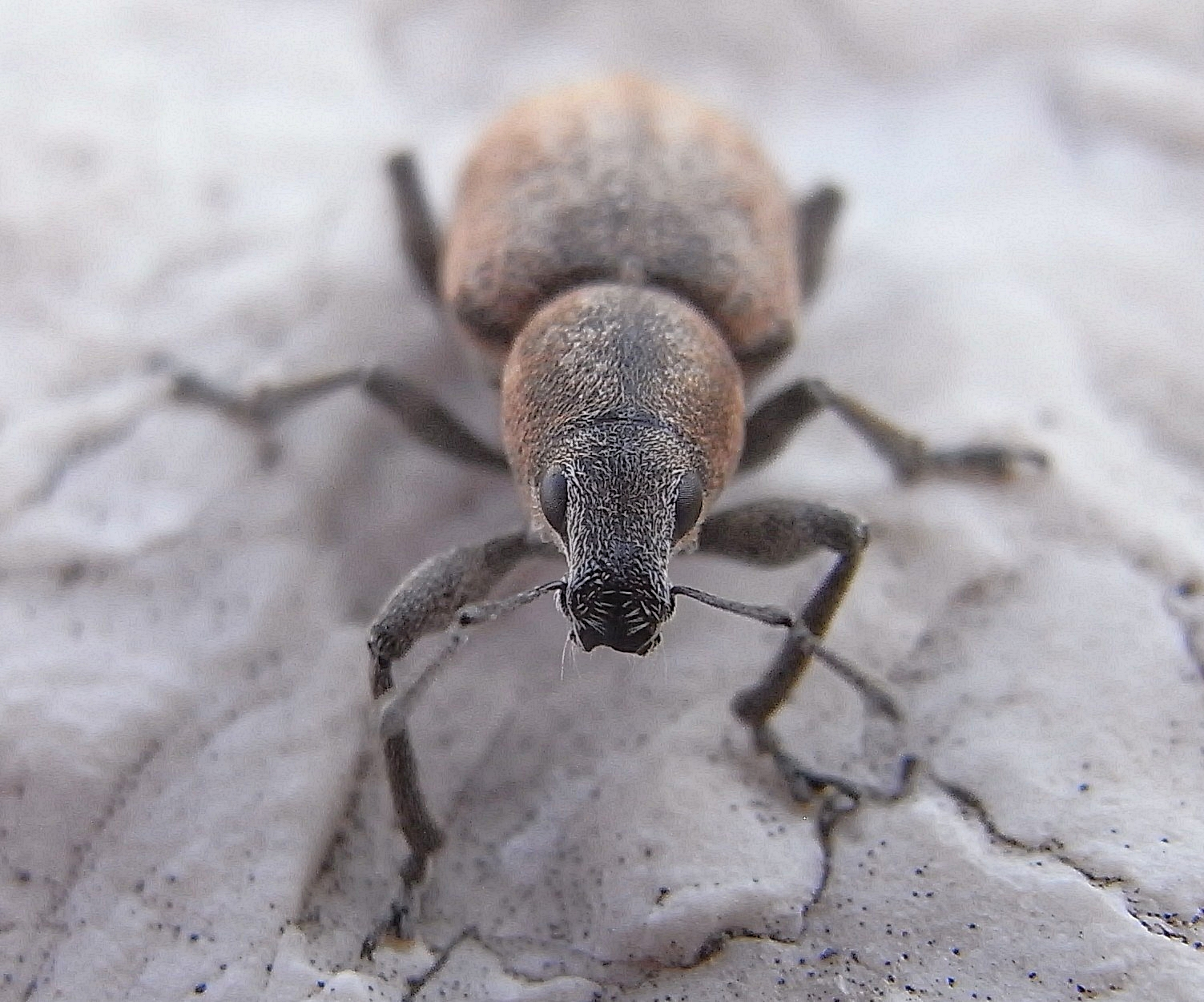
Tanymecus palliatus

1. Acrocoelopus G.A.K. Marshall, 1916
2. Anemeroides G.A.K. Marshall, 1916
3. Cercophorus Chevrolat, 1880
4. Chlorophanus Schönherr in Sahlberg, 1823
5. Cycloderes Schönherr in Sahlberg, 1823
6. Diglossotrox Lacordaire, 1863
7. Esamus Chevrolat, 1880
8. Hauserella Reitter, 1903
9. Krauseus Supare, 1990
10. Megamecus Reitter, 1903
11. Meotiorhynchus Sharp, 1896
12. Mythecops Reitter, 1916
13. Phacephorus Schönherr, 1840
14. Phaenoderus Péringuey, 1892
15. Protenomus Schoenherr, 1826
16. Pseudotanymecus Voss, 1932
17. Scepticus Roelofs, 1873
18. Tanymecus Germar, 1817^{i c g b}
19. Xerodelphax Korotyaev, 1992

=== Tanymecini incertae sedis ===
1. Amotus Casey, 1888^{i c g b}
2. Hadromeropsis Pierce, 1913^{i c g b}
3. Homoeotrachelus Faust, 1886
4. Isodacrys Sharp, 1911^{i c g b}
5. Isodrusus Sharp, 1911^{c g b}
6. Miloderoides Van Dyke, 1936^{i c g b}
7. Minyomerus Horn in Leconte, 1876^{i c g b}
8. Pandeleteinus Champion, 1911^{i c g b}
9. Pandeleteius Schönherr, 1834^{i c g b}
10. Piscatopus Sleeper, 1960
11. Trigonoscutoides O'Brien, 1977^{i c g b}
12. Scalaventer Howden, 1970^{c g b}

Data sources: i = ITIS, c = Catalogue of Life, g = GBIF, b = Bugguide.net
