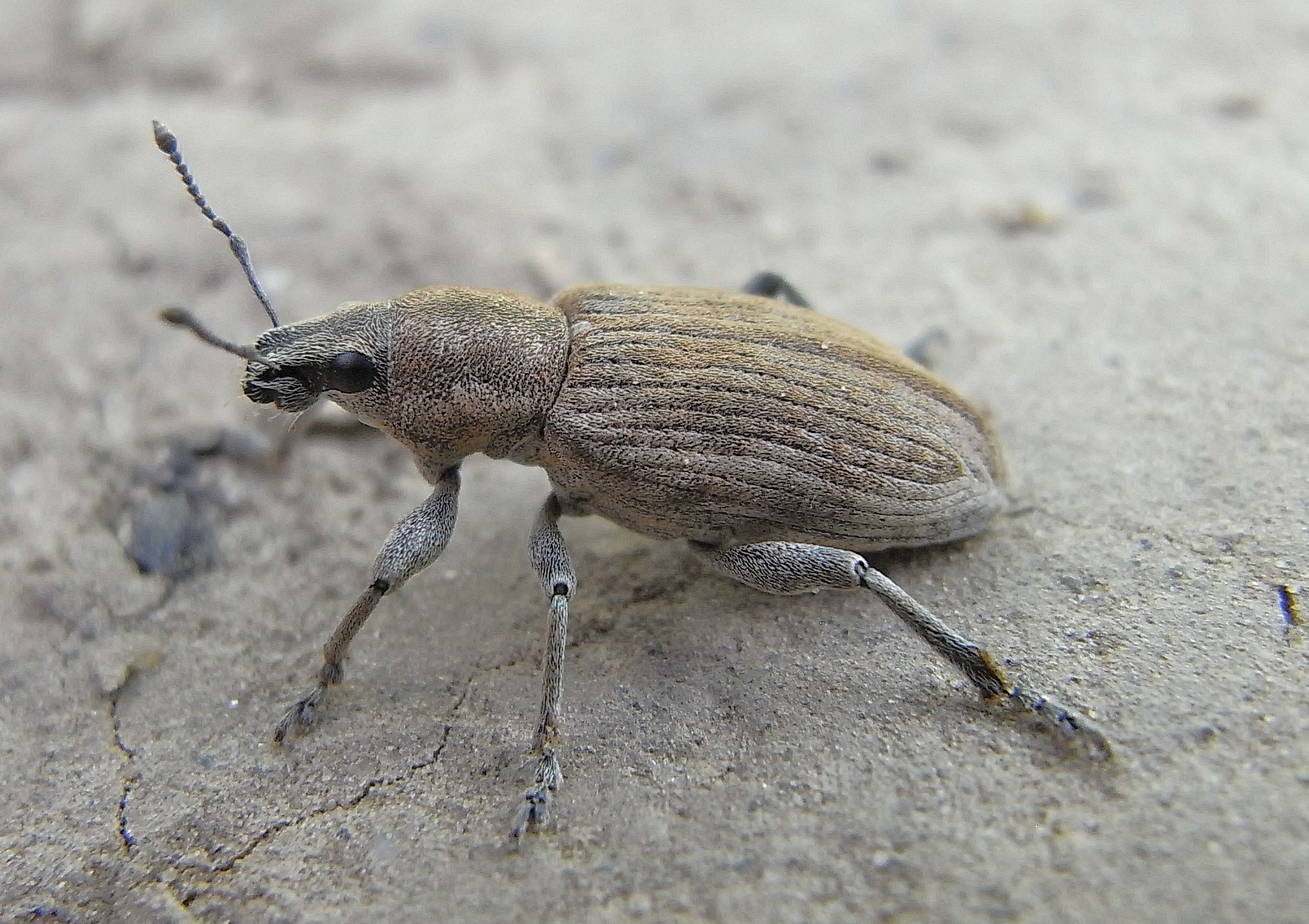
- Tanymecus palliatus

Scientific classification
- Kingdom: Animalia
- Phylum: Arthropoda
- Class: Insecta
- Order: Coleoptera
- Suborder: Polyphaga
- Infraorder: Cucujiformia
- Family: Curculionidae
- Tribe: Tanymecini
- Genus: Tanymecus; Germar, 1817

Diversity
- at least 100 species

= Tanymecus =

Genus of beetles

Tanymecus is a genus of broad-nosed weevils in the beetle family Curculionidae. There are at least 100 described species in Tanymecus.

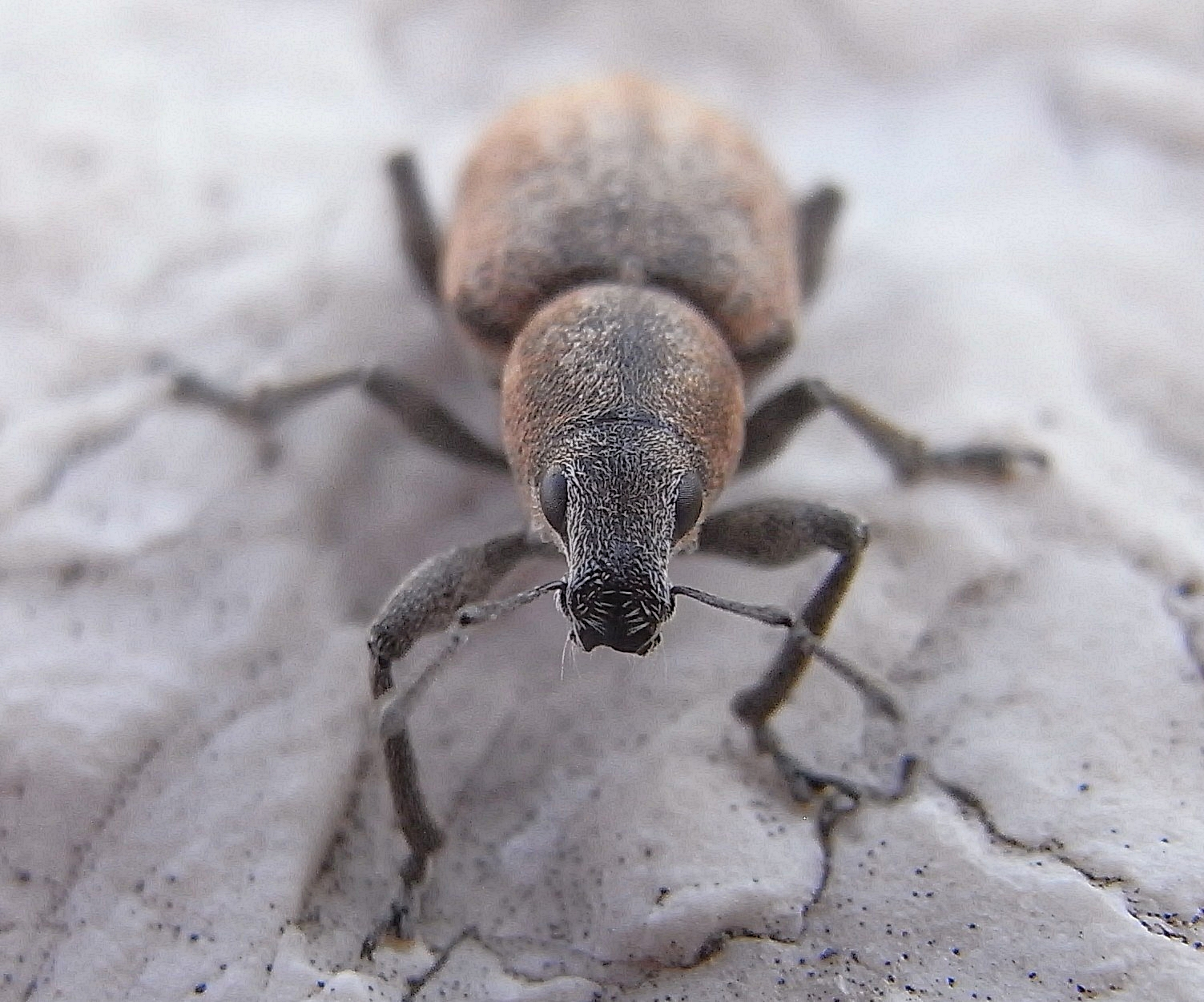
Tanymecus palliatus

== See also ==
- List of Tanymecus species
