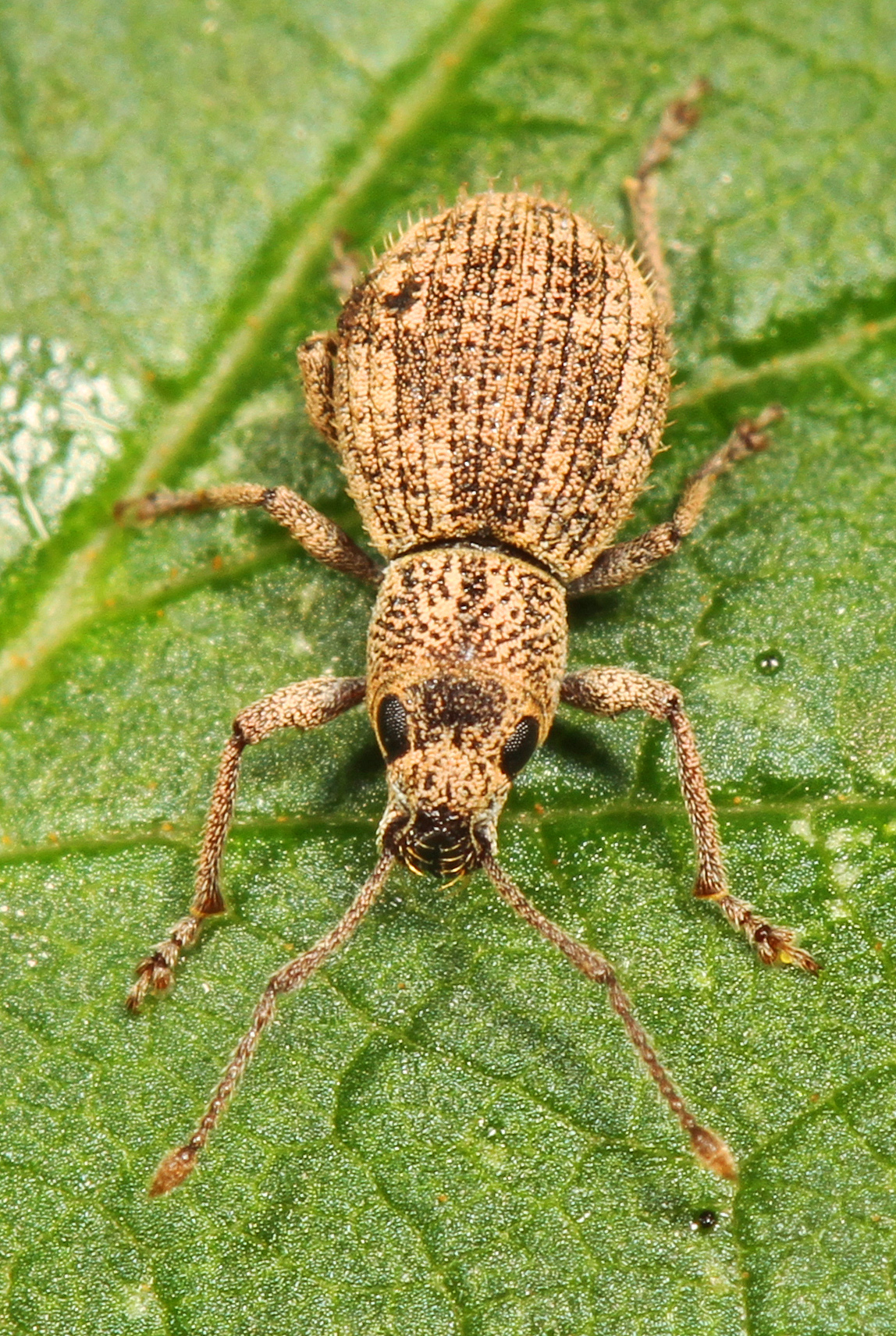
- Calomycterus setarius

Scientific classification
- Kingdom: Animalia
- Phylum: Arthropoda
- Class: Insecta
- Order: Coleoptera
- Suborder: Polyphaga
- Infraorder: Cucujiformia
- Family: Curculionidae
- Subfamily: Entiminae
- Tribe: Cyphicerini; Lacordaire, 1863

Subtribes
- Acanthotrachelina; Cyphicerina; Mylacorrhinina; Myllocerina; Phytoscaphina

= Cyphicerini =

Tribe of beetles

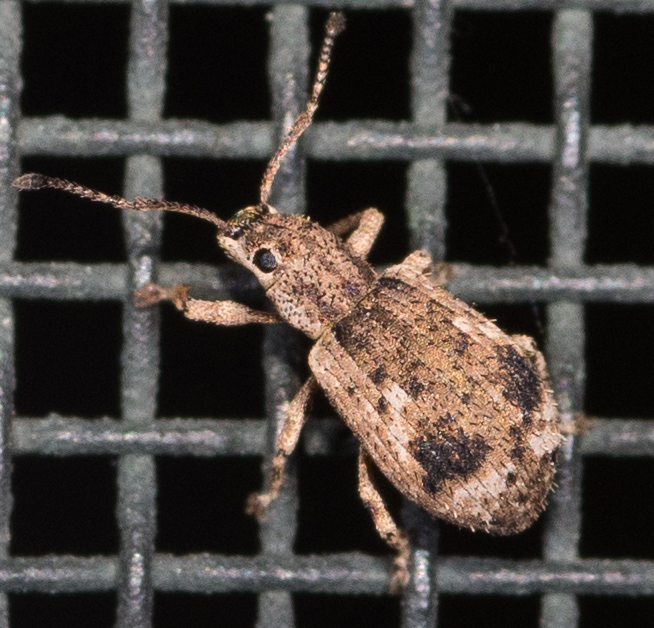
Pseudoedophrys hilleri

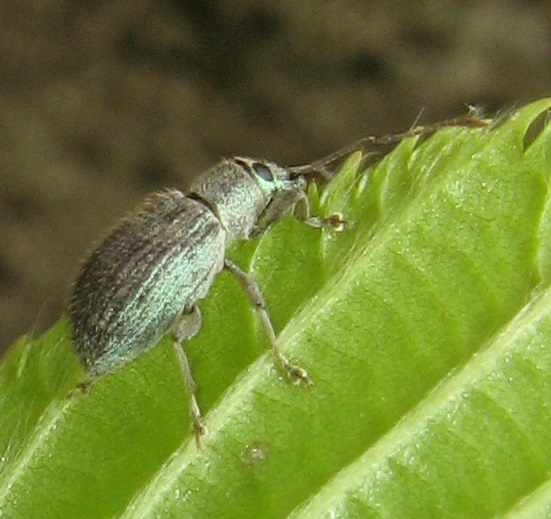
Cyrtepistomus

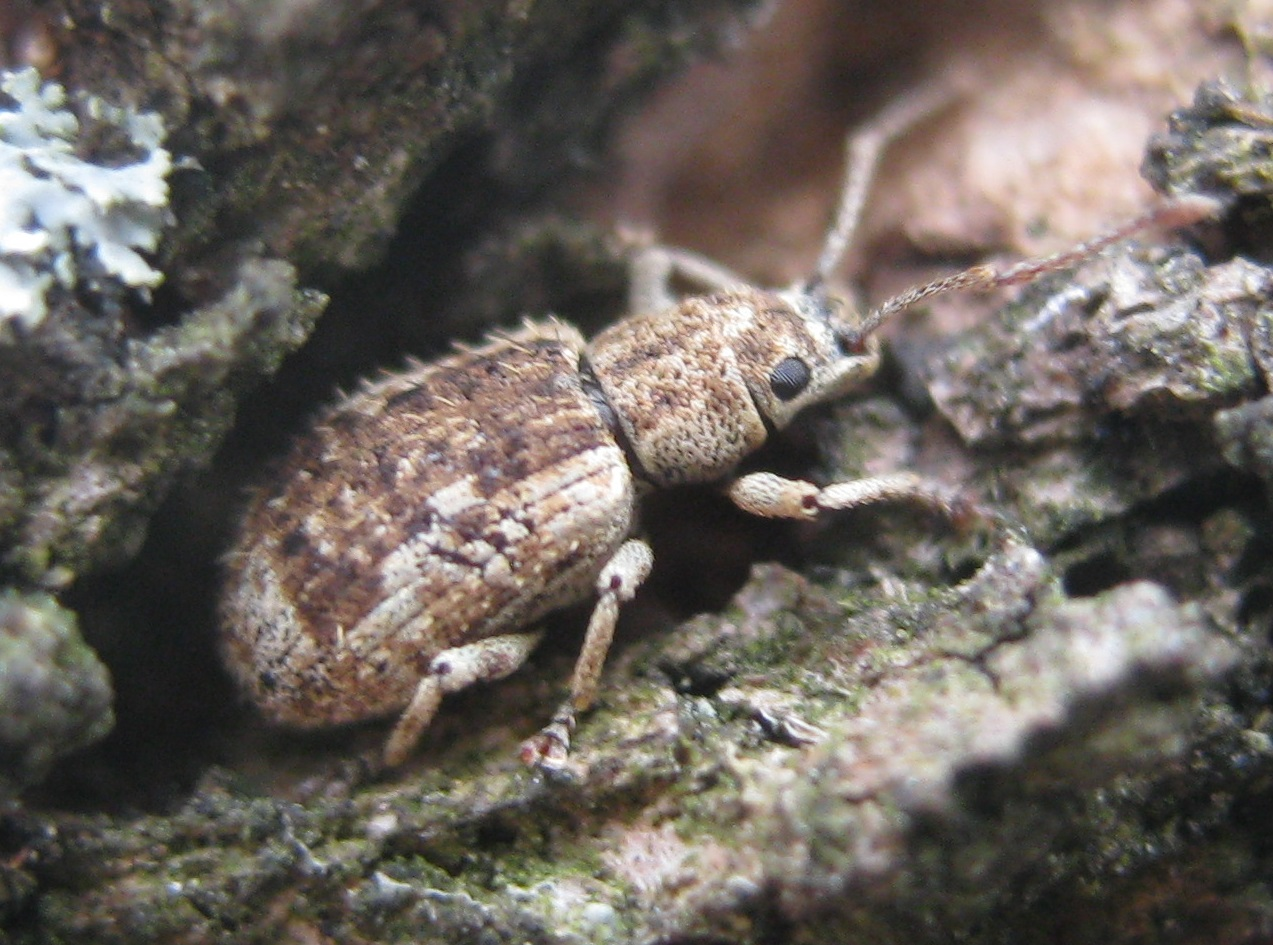
Pseudoedophrys hilleri

Cyphicerini is a tribe of oriental broad-nosed weevils in the subfamily of beetles known as Entiminae.

== Genera ==
These 134 genera belong to the tribe Cyphicerini:

- Acanthotrachelus Schoenherr, 1842^{c g}
- Afrodolius Marshall, 1946^{c g}
- Afrophytoscaphus Hustache, 1936^{c g}
- Agrostes Marshall, 1944^{c g}
- Allaeoptochus Kojima & Morimoto, 2006^{c g}
- Altonomus Desbrochers des Loges, 1907^{c g}
- Amblyrhinus Schoenherr, 1826^{c g}
- Amrikus Pajni & Sidhu, 1982^{c g}
- Amyllocerus Kojima & Morimoto, 2006^{c g}
- Anosimus Roelofs, 1873^{c g}
- Aphytoscaphus Hustache, 1947^{c g}
- Arhines Schoenherr, 1834^{c g}
- Aspidomycter Marshall, 1943^{c g}
- Asporus Marshall, 1944^{c g}
- Asynetus Marshall, 1944^{c g}
- Atmesia Pascoe, 1870^{c g}
- Baryconorrhinus Voss, 1959^{c g}
- Baryrrhinus Marshall, 1944^{c g}
- Breviepistomus Pajni, Sidhu & Kumar, 1987^{c g}
- Calomycterus Roelofs, 1873^{i c g b}
- Canoixus Roelofs, 1873^{c g}
- Cephaloptochus Bajtenov, 1974^{c g}
- Chloebius Schoenherr, 1826^{c g}
- Cnaphoscapus Marshall, 1944^{c g}
- Cnodostethus Marshall, 1944^{c g}
- Corigetus Desbrochers des Loges, 1872^{c g}
- Corymacronus Kojima & Morimoto, 2006^{c g}
- Crinorrhinus Marshall, 1941^{c g}
- Cyllomerus Marshall, 1954^{c g}
- Cyphicerinus Marshall, 1928^{c g}
- Cyphicerus Schoenherr, 1823^{c g}
- Cyrtepistomus Marshall, 1913^{i c g b}
- Deiradorrhinus Marshall, 1941^{c g}
- Diatropus Marshall, 1944^{c g}
- Doliophron Marshall, 1941^{c g}
- Drymophoetus Marshall, 1944^{c g}
- Echinomyllocerus Yoro & Kojima, 2017^{c}
- Ecmyllocerus Zimmerman, 1994^{c g}
- Emperorrhinus Marshall, 1916^{c g}
- Epicalus Motschulsky, 1858^{c g}
- Epilasius Faust, 1894^{c g}
- Episomoides Kôno, 1930^{c g}
- Epius Marshall, 1948^{c g}
- Epixynus Marshall, 1944^{c g}
- Eryngus Marshall, 1948^{c g}
- Eumyllocerus Sharp, 1896^{c g}
- Euphalia Pascoe, 1870^{c g}
- Eusomidius Faust, 1885^{c g}
- Gobinda Pajni, Sidhu & Kumar, 1987^{c g}
- Gyratogaster Daniel & Daniel, 1903^{c g}
- Hackeria Lea, 1911^{c g}
- Hamartus Marshall, 1944^{c g}
- Hemerus Marshall, 1944^{c g}
- Heteroptochus Faust, 1886^{c g}
- Hilaus Marshall, 1944^{c g}
- Himachala Pajni, 1990^{c g}
- Hirsutopes Pajni, 1990^{c g}
- Holorrhynchus Marshall, 1916^{c g}
- Howeocis Lea, 1926^{c g}
- Hypenephorus Marshall, 1944^{c g}
- Hyperstylus Roelofs, 1873^{c g}
- Indophytoscaphus Pajni & Sidhu, 1982^{c g}
- Iranorrhinus Voss, 1959 ^{c g}
- Kairakia Nasreddinov, 1986^{c g}
- Konomycterus Kojima & Morimoto, 2006 ^{c g}
- Lagenolobus Faust, 1887^{c g}
- Leianisorhynchus Pic, 1905^{c g}
- Lepidepistomodes Kojima & Morimoto, 2006^{c g}
- Lepidepistomus Kojima & Morimoto, 2006^{c g}
- Macrocorynus Schoenherr, 1823 ^{c g}
- Marshalla Pajni, 1990^{c g}
- Matesia Lea, 1904^{c g}
- Meionops Marshall, 1917^{c g}
- Myllocerinus Reitter, 1900^{c g}
- Mylloceropsis Aurivillius, 1910 ^{c g}
- Myllocerus Schönherr, 1823^{i c g b}
- Myosides Roelofs, 1873^{c g b}
- Neomyllocerus Voss, 1934^{c g}
- Neophytoscaphus Hustache, 1935^{c g}
- Neoptochus Horn, 1876^{i c g b}
- Nirala Pajni, Sidhu & Kumar, 1988^{c g}
- Nothomyllocerus Kojima & Morimoto, 2006^{c g}
- Oedophrys Marshall, 1941^{c g}
- Onychophyllobius Schilsky, 1908^{c g}
- Oophthalmus Marshall, 1943^{c g}
- Orchobius Marshall, 1944^{c g}
- Ortholcus Marshall, 1944^{c g}
- Oxyophthalmus Hochhuth, 1847^{c g}
- Paramycter Marshall, 1944^{c g}
- Parapoteriothorax Ter-Minasian & Nasreddinov, 1978^{c g}
- Parascaphus Marshall, 1944^{c g}
- Paratitinia Zimmerman & Oberprieler, 2014^{c g}
- Paurommatus Marshall, 1944^{c g}
- Peltotrachelus Marshall, 1917^{c g}
- Peranosimus Voss, 1943^{c g}
- Peronaspis Suvorov, 1915^{c g}
- Phaylomerinthus Schoenherr, 1842^{c g}
- Pholicerus Marshall, 1944^{c g}
- Phrixopogon Marshall, 1941^{c g}
- Phylladobius Marshall, 1944^{c g}
- Phyllolytus Fairmaire, 1889^{c g}
- Phytoscaphus Schoenherr, 1826^{c g}
- Piezophrys Marshall, 1944^{c g}
- Platymycterus Marshall, 1918^{c g}
- Platytrachelus Schoenherr, 1842^{c g}
- Pollendera Motschulsky, 1858^{c g}
- Poteriothorax Ter-Minasian, 1973^{c g}
- Prolobothrix Voss, 1967^{c g}
- Pseudobarirrhinus Magnano, 2009^{c g}
- Pseudoedophrys Kojima & Morimoto, 2006^{c g b}
- Pseudomyllocerinus Voss, 1959^{c g}
- Pseudoparascaphus Magnano, 2009^{c g}
- Psidiopsis Pascoe, 1872^{c g}
- Ptochella Reitter, 1906^{c g}
- Ptochus Schoenherr, 1826^{c g}
- Rhicnostomus Marshall, 1944^{c g}
- Rhinospineus Hoffmann, 1961^{c g}
- Robertoides Ramamurthy & Ghai, 1987^{c g}
- Salbachia Reitter, 1906^{c g}
- Scaeorrhinus Marshall, 1944^{c g}
- Sematia Zimmerman, 1994^{c g}
- Sphaeroptochus Egorov & Zherikhin, 1991^{c g}
- Stelorrhinus Marshall, 1916^{c g}
- Synomus Pascoe, 1885^{c g}
- Syrphax Marshall, 1944^{c g}
- Tanyscapus Marshall, 1944^{c g}
- Taractor Pajni, 1990^{c g}
- Telenica Pascoe, 1872^{c g}
- Thalponomus Marshall, 1944^{c g}
- Thlipsomerus Marshall, 1944^{c g}
- Thyraulus Marshall, 1944^{c g}
- Tolmesis Faust, 1897^{c g}
- Transptochus Pajni, Sidhu & Kumar, 1989^{c g}
- Trapezauchen Marshall, 1944^{c g}

Data sources: i = ITIS, c = Catalogue of Life, g = GBIF, b = Bugguide.net
