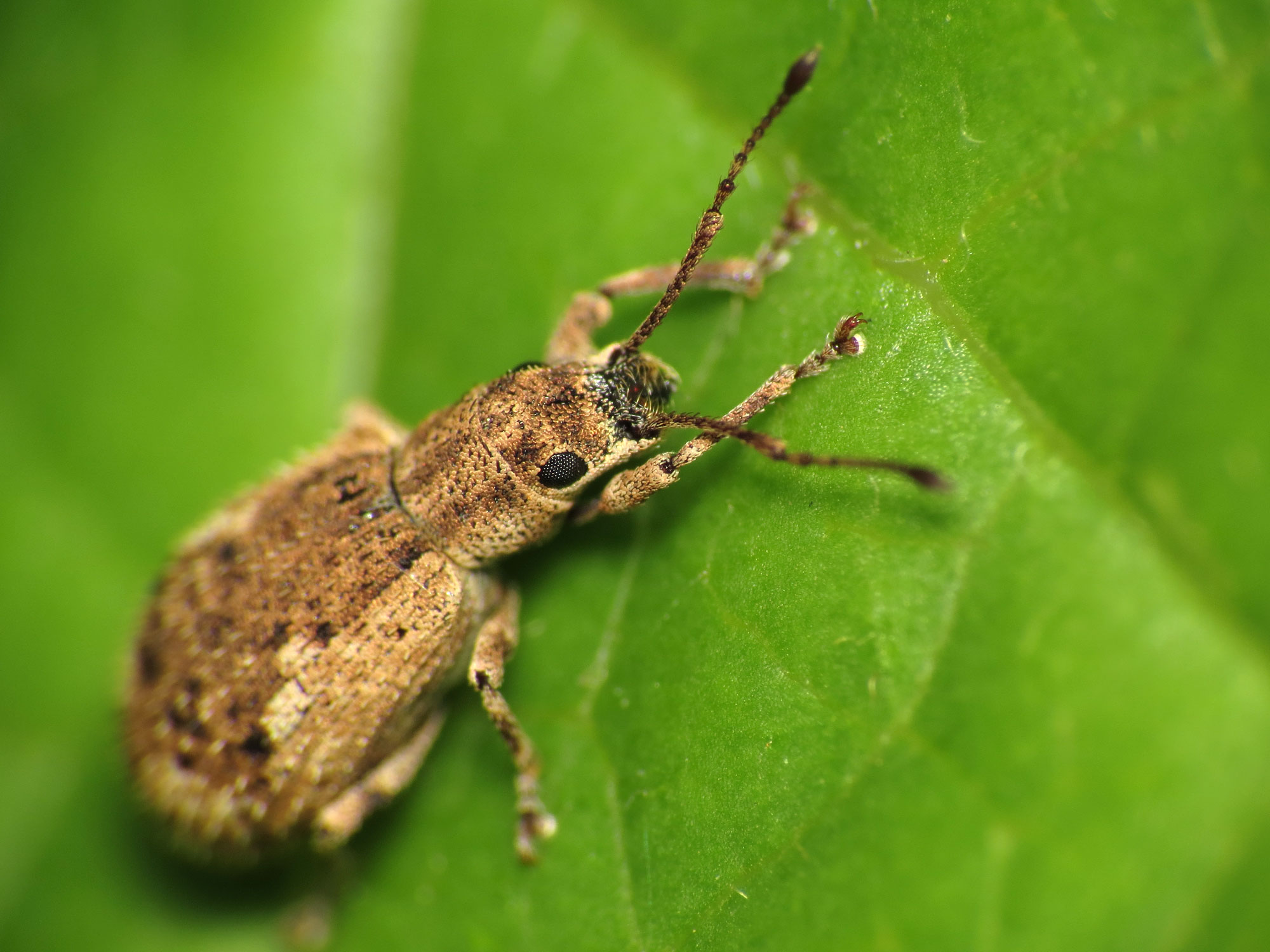
- Pseudoedophrys hilleri

Scientific classification
- Domain: Eukaryota
- Kingdom: Animalia
- Phylum: Arthropoda
- Class: Insecta
- Order: Coleoptera
- Suborder: Polyphaga
- Infraorder: Cucujiformia
- Family: Curculionidae
- Tribe: Cyphicerini
- Subtribe: Cyphicerina
- Genus: Pseudoedophrys; Kojima & Morimoto, 2006
- Species: P. hilleri

Binomial name
- Pseudoedophrys hilleri (Faust, 1889)

= Pseudoedophrys =

Genus of beetles

Pseudoedophrys is a genus of oriental broad-nosed weevils in the beetle family Curculionidae. There is one described species in Pseudoedophrys, P. hilleri. It originated in Japan, and can now be found in eastern North America.

This species was transferred from Oedophrys into the new genus Pseudoedophrys in 2006.

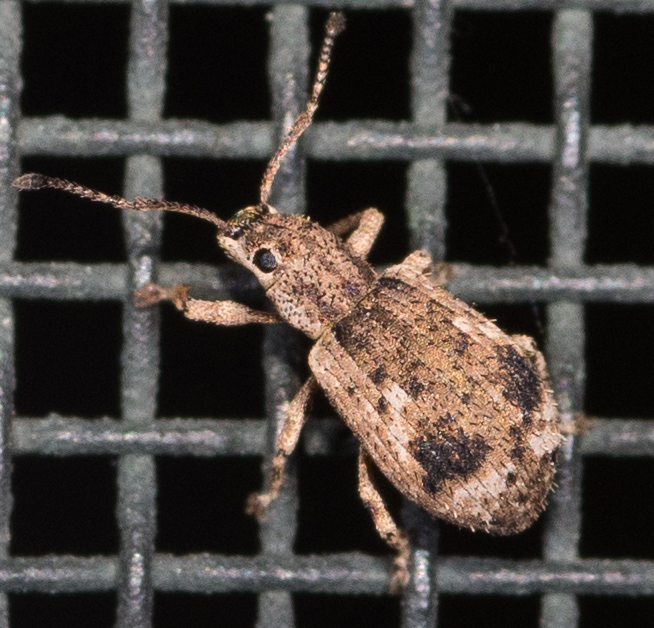
Pseudoedophrys hilleri
