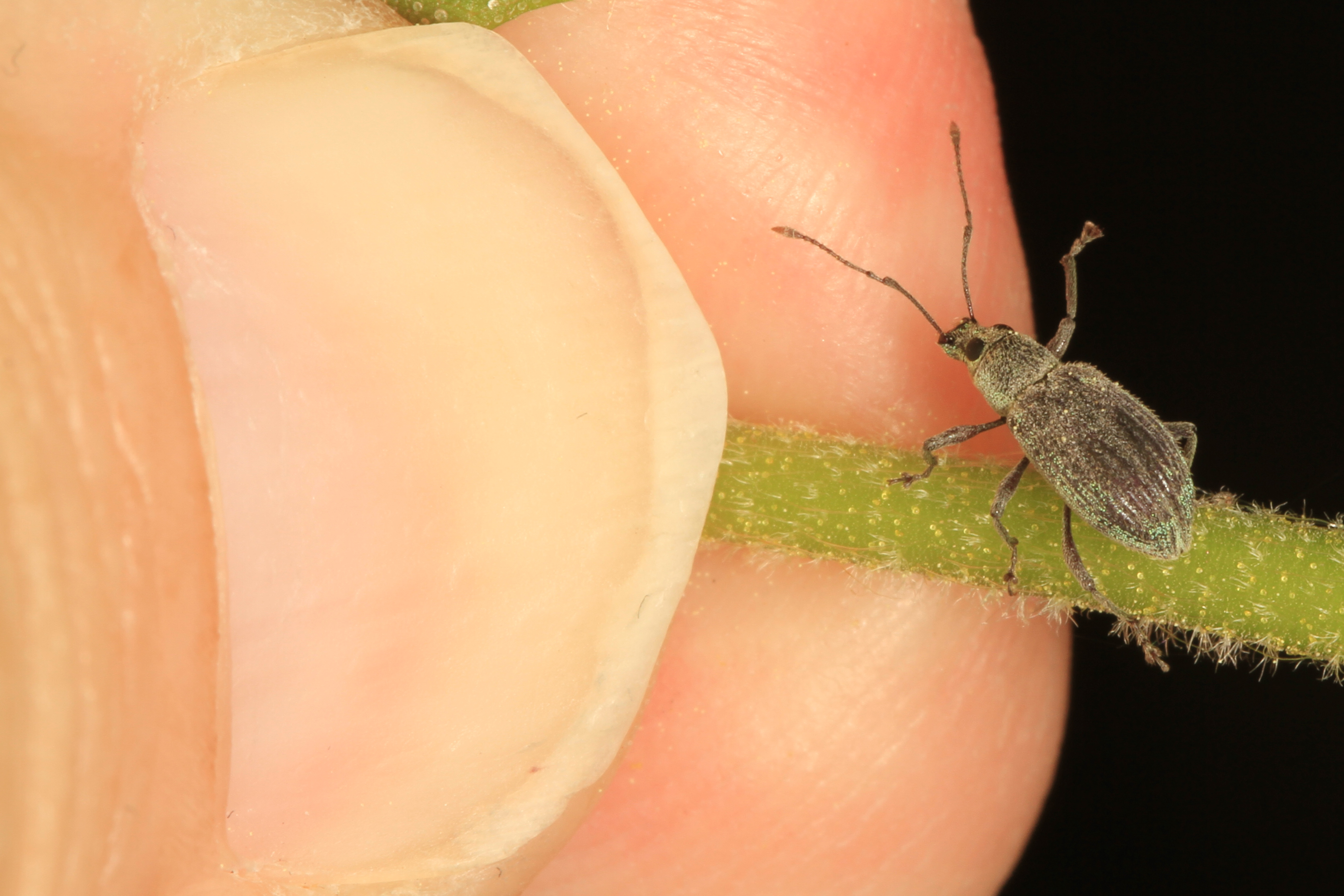

Scientific classification
- Kingdom: Animalia
- Phylum: Arthropoda
- Clade: Pancrustacea
- Class: Insecta
- Order: Coleoptera
- Suborder: Polyphaga
- Infraorder: Cucujiformia
- Family: Curculionidae
- Genus: Cyrtepistomus
- Species: C. castaneus

Binomial name
- Cyrtepistomus castaneus (Roelofs, 1873)

= Cyrtepistomus castaneus =

Species of beetle

Cyrtepistomus castaneus, the Asiatic oak weevil, is a species of Asian broad-nosed weevil in the beetle family Curculionidae. It is native to Asia, and was first found in North America in 1933. Larvae feed on root hairs in soil, whereas adult beetles are defoliators of Quercus and Acer rubrum trees.

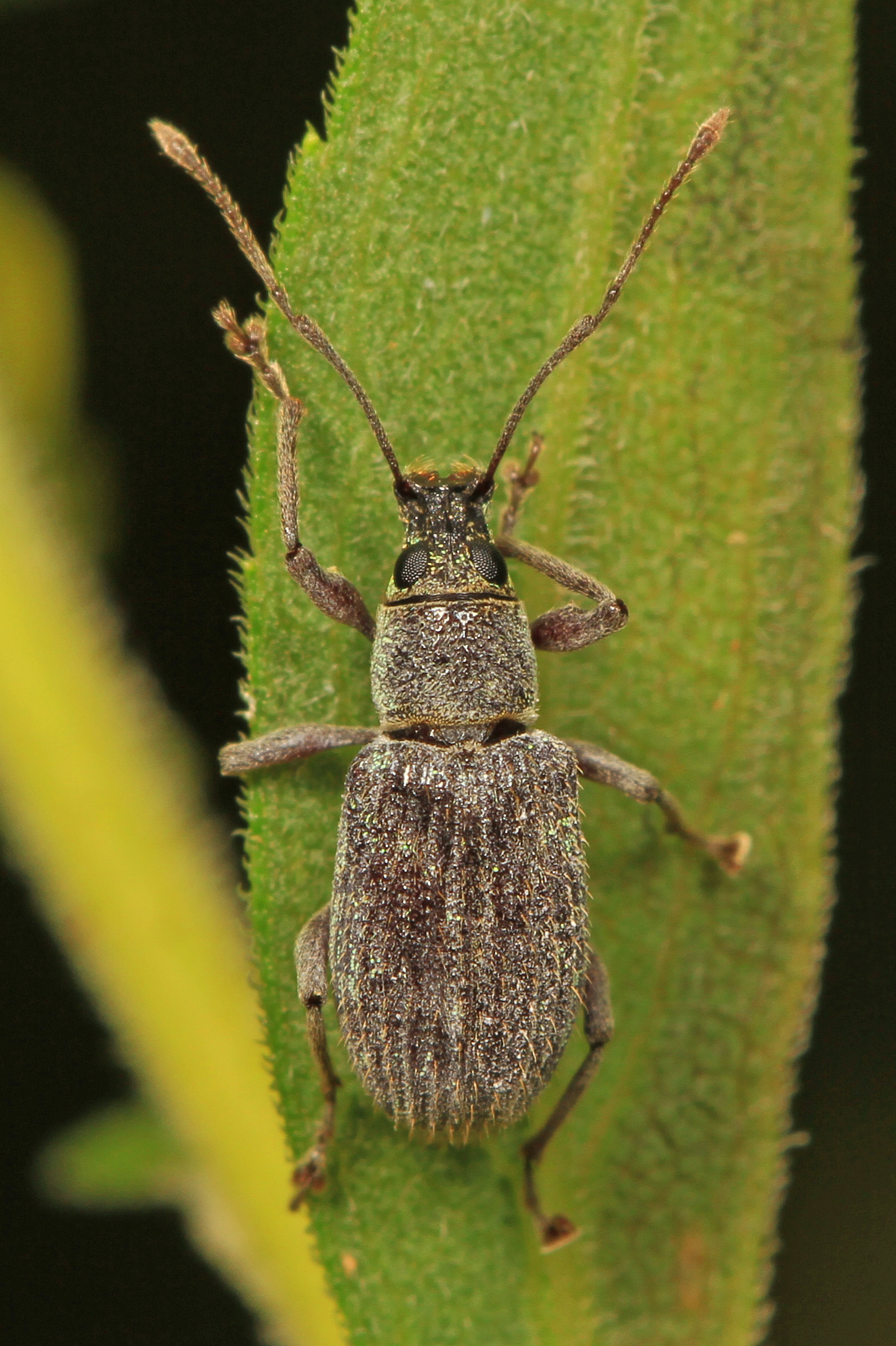
Asiatic oak weevil, Cyrtepistomus castaneus

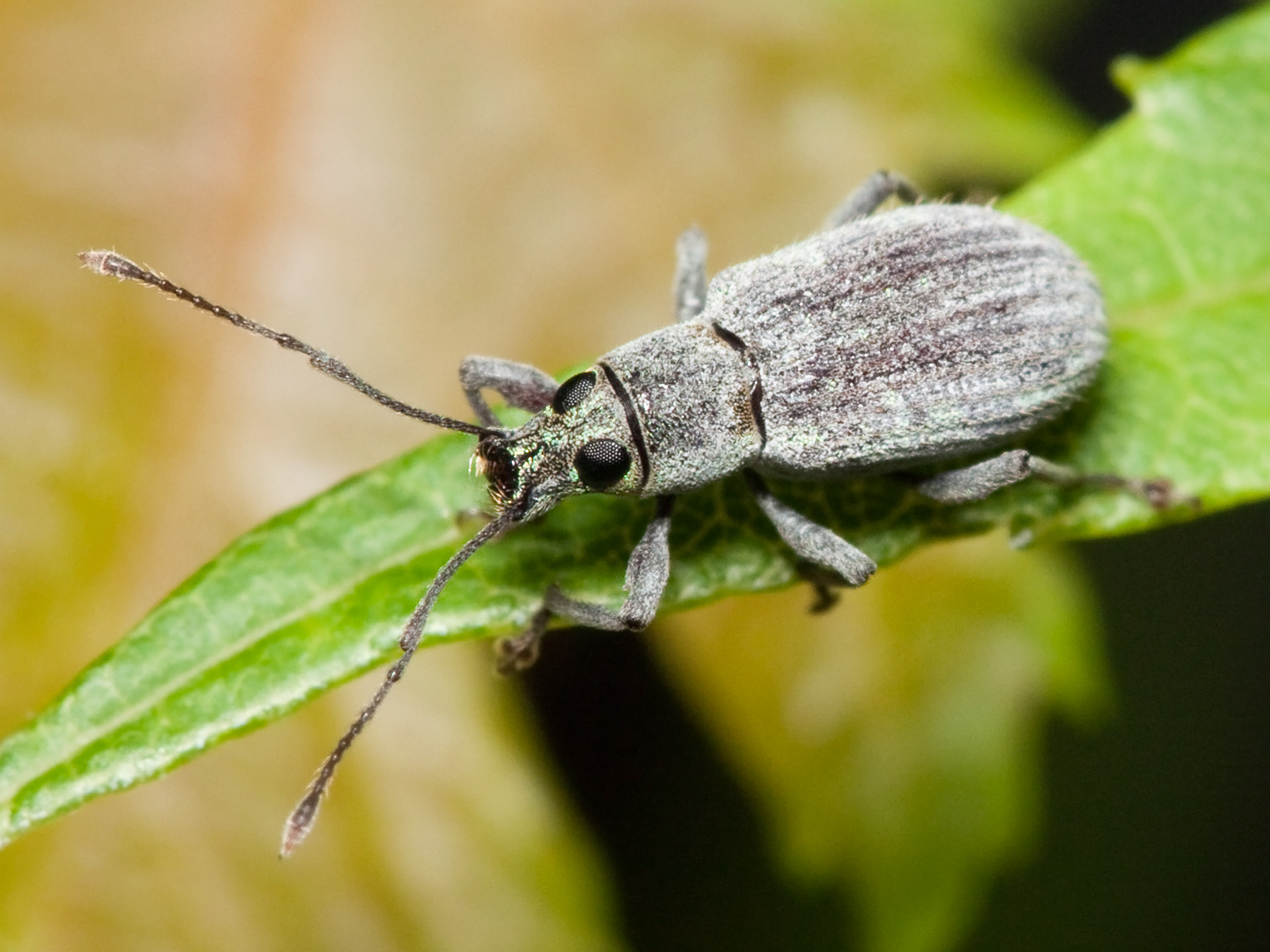
Asiatic oak weevil, Cyrtepistomus castaneus
