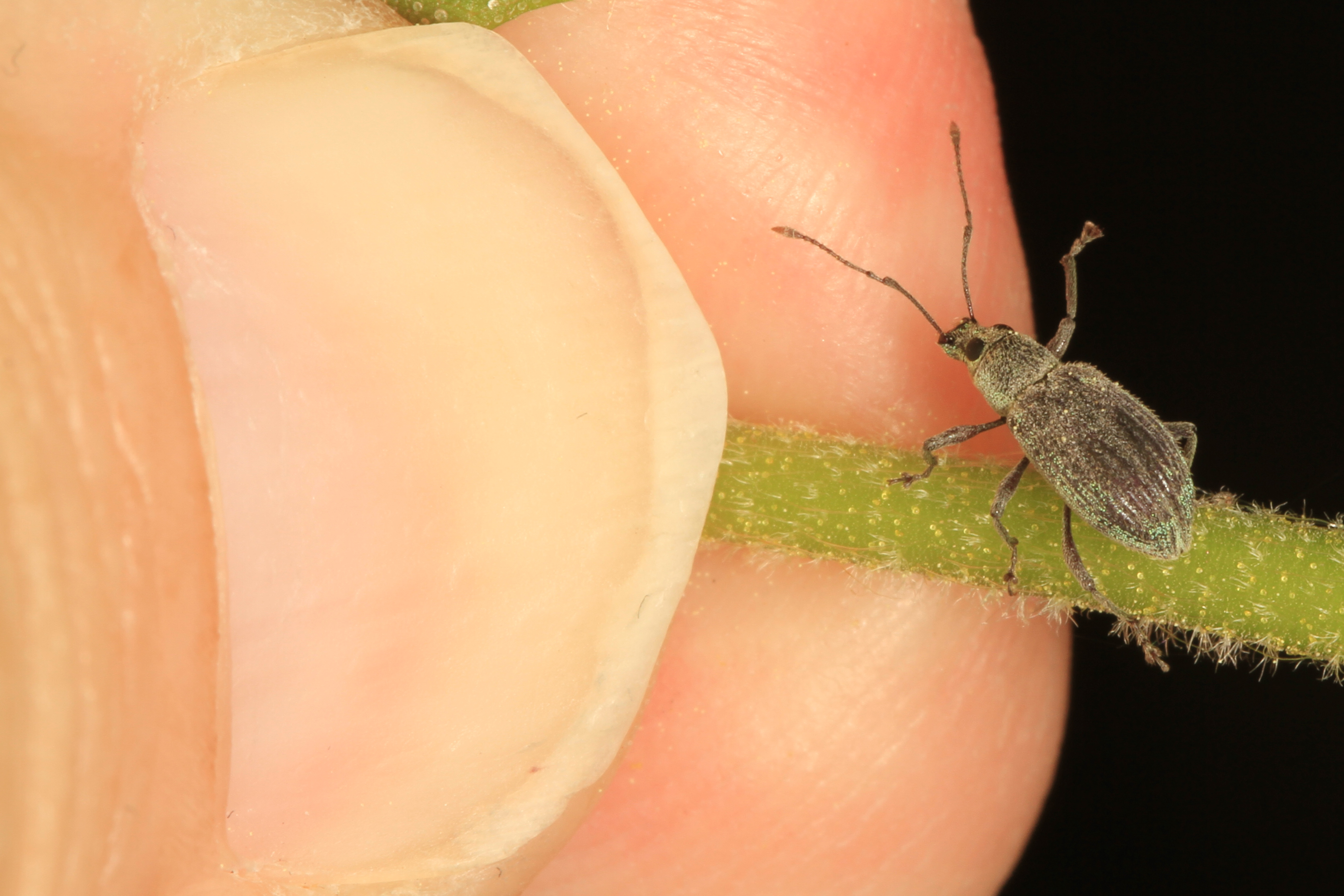
- Cyrtepistomus castaneus

Scientific classification
- Domain: Eukaryota
- Kingdom: Animalia
- Phylum: Arthropoda
- Class: Insecta
- Order: Coleoptera
- Suborder: Polyphaga
- Infraorder: Cucujiformia
- Family: Curculionidae
- Tribe: Cyphicerini
- Genus: Cyrtepistomus; Marshall, 1913

= Cyrtepistomus =

Genus of beetles

Cyrtepistomus is a genus of oriental broad-nosed weevils in the beetle family Curculionidae. There are at least 20 described species in Cyrtepistomus.

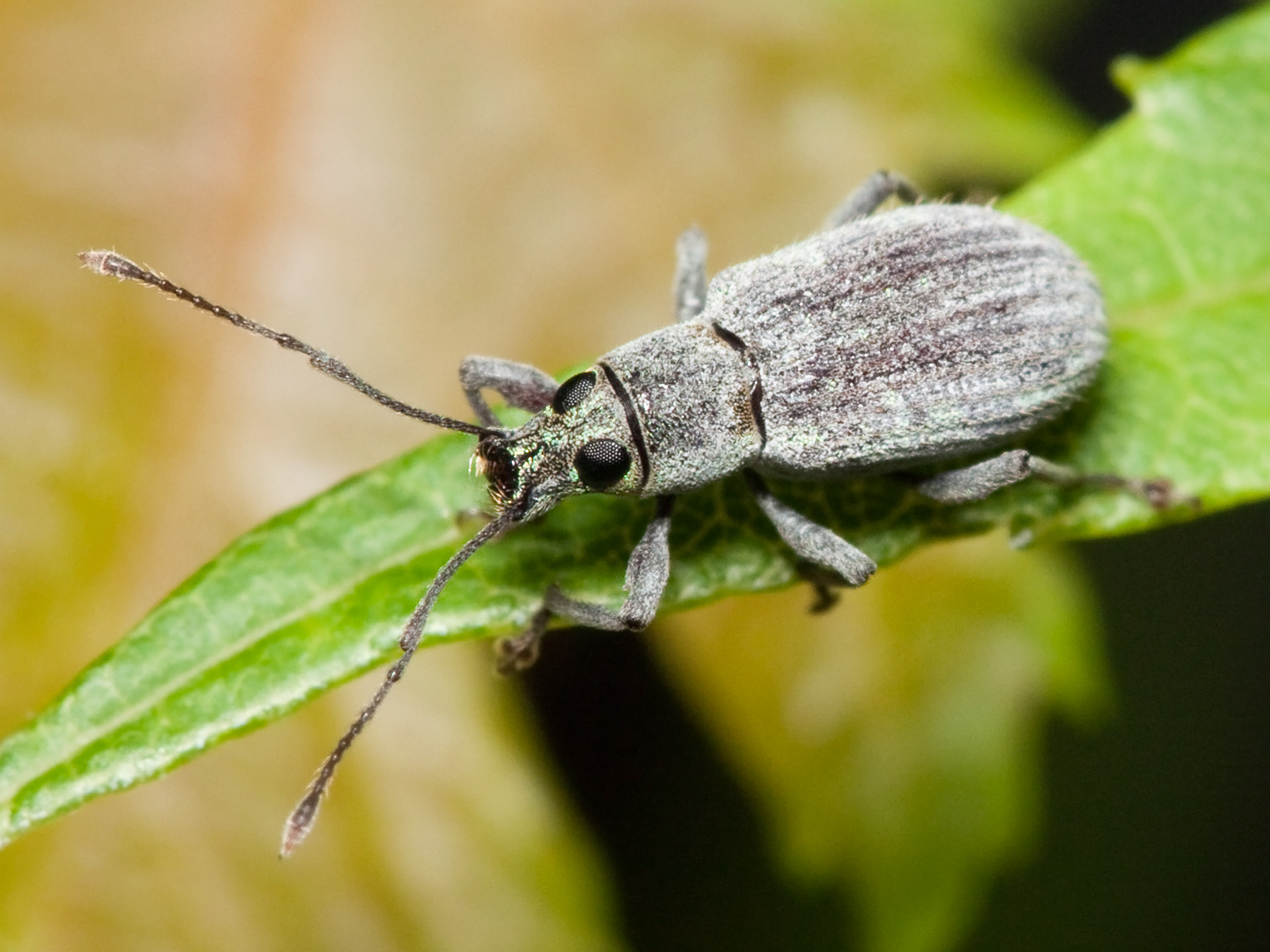
Cyrtepistomus castaneus

== Species ==
These 27 species belong to the genus Cyrtepistomus:

- Cyrtepistomus albus Pajni, 1990^{c g}
- Cyrtepistomus bardus Marshall, 1941^{c g}
- Cyrtepistomus bicallosus Pajni, 1990^{c g}
- Cyrtepistomus castaneus (Roelofs, 1873)^{i c g b} (Asiatic oak weevil)
- Cyrtepistomus championi Pajni, 1990^{c g}
- Cyrtepistomus chloris Pajni, 1990^{c g}
- Cyrtepistomus frontalis Pajni, 1990^{c g}
- Cyrtepistomus herbicola Pajni, 1990^{c g}
- Cyrtepistomus himachalensis Pajni, 1990^{c g}
- Cyrtepistomus infidelis Pajni, 1990^{c g}
- Cyrtepistomus jucundus (Redtenbacher, 1844)^{c g}
- Cyrtepistomus lanatus Pajni, 1990^{c g}
- Cyrtepistomus necopinus (Faust, 1897)^{c g}
- Cyrtepistomus pennosus Marshall, 1913^{c g}
- Cyrtepistomus pini Marshall, 1924^{c g}
- Cyrtepistomus planus Pajni, 1990^{c g}
- Cyrtepistomus qularis Pajni, 1990^{c g}
- Cyrtepistomus rudis Pajni, 1990^{c g}
- Cyrtepistomus sabulosus Magnano, 2009^{c g}
- Cyrtepistomus subcostatus Pajni, 1990^{c g}
- Cyrtepistomus sulcifrons Pajni, 1990^{c g}
- Cyrtepistomus tenuiclavis Pajni, 1990^{c g}
- Cyrtepistomus testatus (Faust, 1895)^{c g}
- Cyrtepistomus tuberculatus Pajni, 1990^{c g}
- Cyrtepistomus varicolor Pajni, 1990^{c g}
- Cyrtepistomus victoriae Pajni, 1990^{c g}
- Cyrtepistomus vinctus Pajni, 1990^{c g}

Data sources: i = ITIS, c = Catalogue of Life, g = GBIF, b = Bugguide.net
