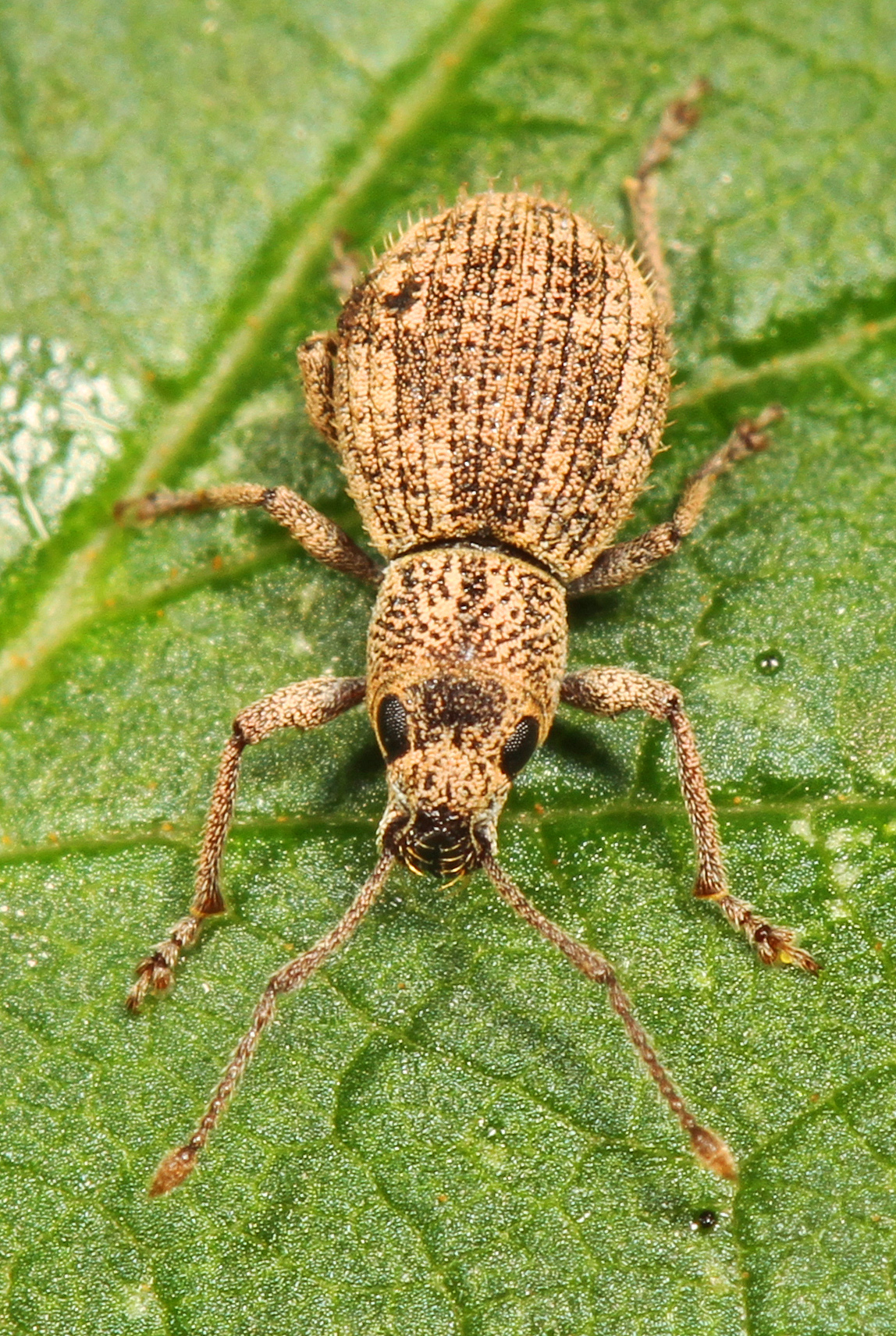
- Calomycterus setarius

Scientific classification
- Domain: Eukaryota
- Kingdom: Animalia
- Phylum: Arthropoda
- Class: Insecta
- Order: Coleoptera
- Suborder: Polyphaga
- Infraorder: Cucujiformia
- Family: Curculionidae
- Tribe: Cyphicerini
- Genus: Calomycterus; Roelofs, 1873

= Calomycterus =

Genus of beetles

Calomycterus is a genus of oriental broad-nosed weevils in the beetle family Curculionidae. There are about 11 described species in Calomycterus.

== Species ==
These 11 species belong to the genus Calomycterus:

- Calomycterus brevicollis Voss, 1957^{c g}
- Calomycterus distans (Faust, 1886)^{c g}
- Calomycterus inaequalis Marshall, 1941^{c g}
- Calomycterus jucundus Voss, 1943^{c g}
- Calomycterus modestus (Faust, 1890)^{c g}
- Calomycterus nodosus Marshall, 1941^{c g}
- Calomycterus obconicus Chao, 1974^{c g}
- Calomycterus obesus Faust, 1897^{c g}
- Calomycterus periteloides (Faust, 1886)^{c g}
- Calomycterus setarius Roelofs, 1873^{i c g b} (imported long-horned weevil)
- Calomycterus strigiceps Marshall, 1934^{c g}

Data sources: i = ITIS, c = Catalogue of Life, g = GBIF, b = Bugguide.net
