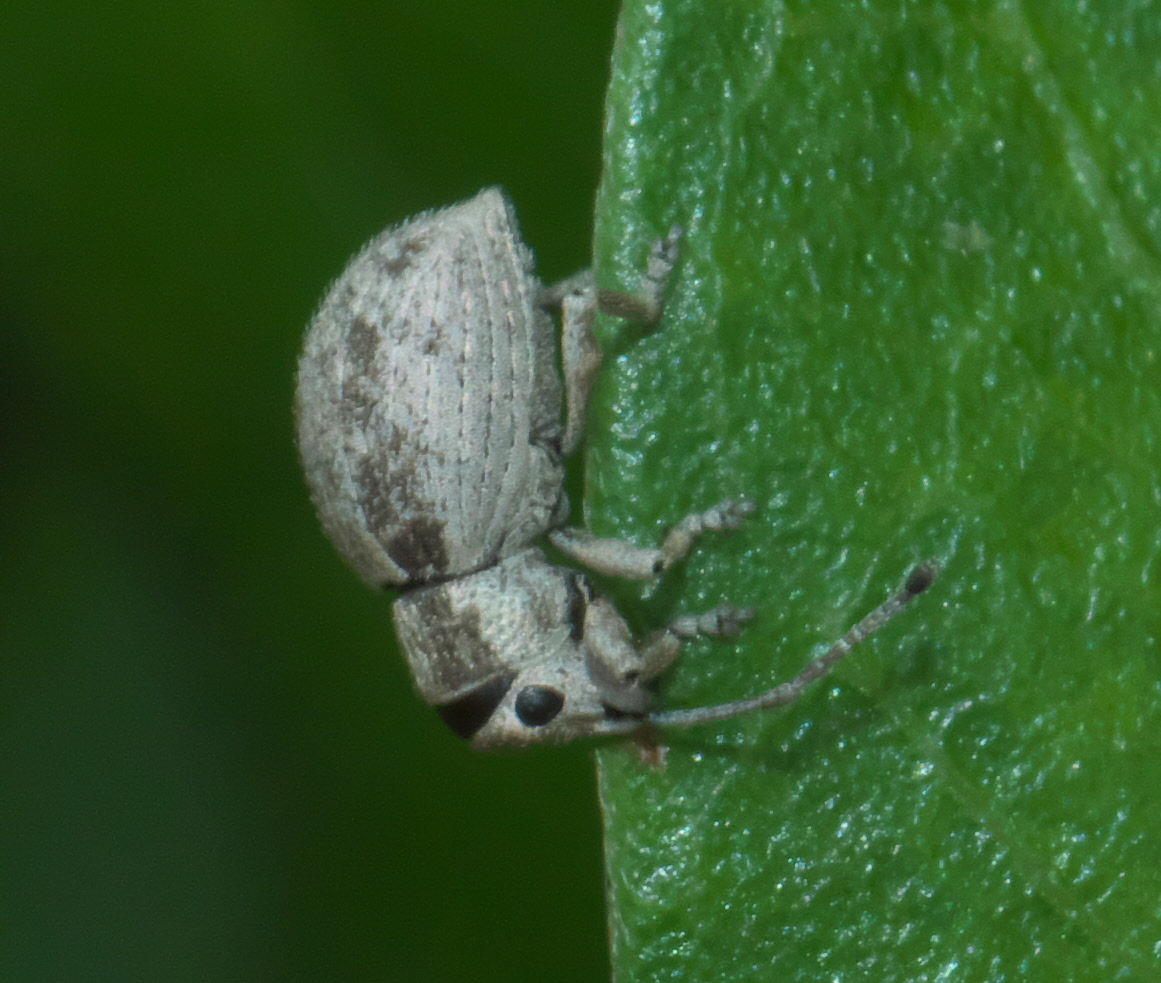
- Neoptochus adspersus

Scientific classification
- Kingdom: Animalia
- Phylum: Arthropoda
- Class: Insecta
- Order: Coleoptera
- Suborder: Polyphaga
- Infraorder: Cucujiformia
- Family: Curculionidae
- Subtribe: Myllocerina
- Genus: Neoptochus; Horn, 1876

= Neoptochus =

Genus of beetles

Neoptochus is a genus of oriental broad-nosed weevils in the beetle family Curculionidae. There is at least one described species in Neoptochus, N. adspersus.

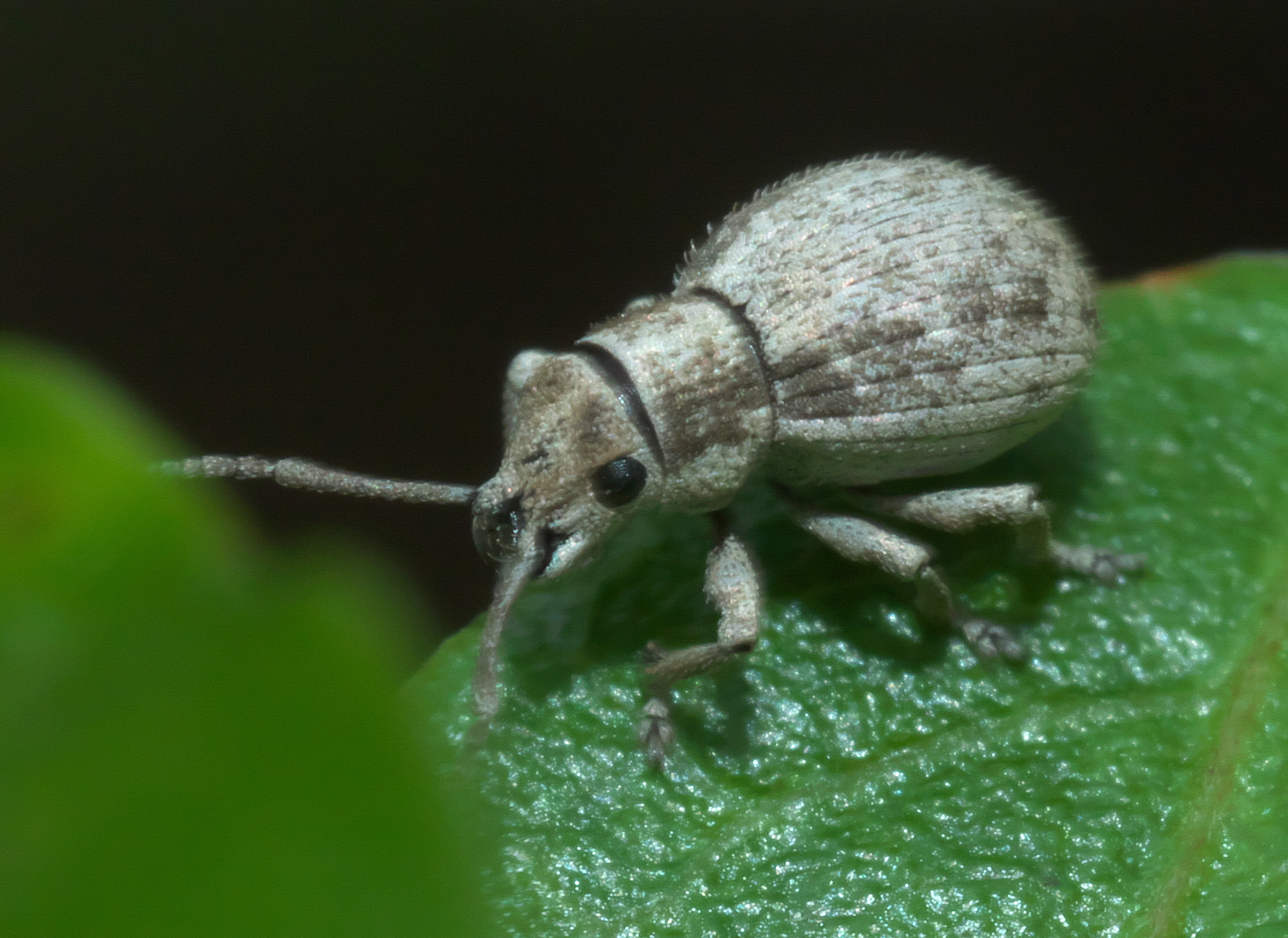
Neoptochus adspersus
