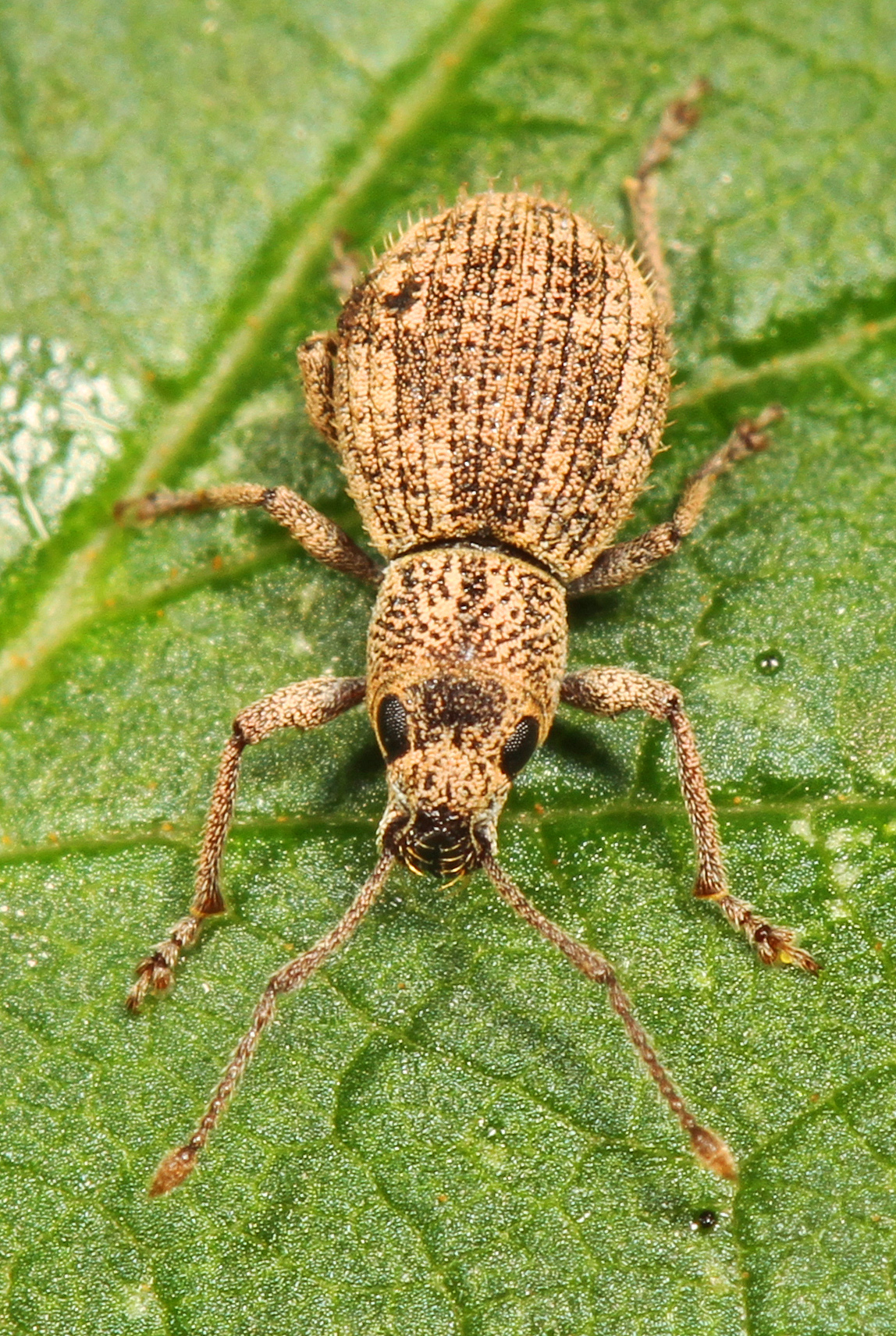

Scientific classification
- Domain: Eukaryota
- Kingdom: Animalia
- Phylum: Arthropoda
- Class: Insecta
- Order: Coleoptera
- Suborder: Polyphaga
- Infraorder: Cucujiformia
- Family: Curculionidae
- Genus: Calomycterus
- Species: C. setarius

Binomial name
- Calomycterus setarius Roelofs, 1873

= Calomycterus setarius =

Species of beetle

Calomycterus setarius, the imported long-horned weevil, is a species of oriental broad-nosed weevil in the beetle family Curculionidae. It is native to Japan, and has become established and common in eastern North America.
