= Arhines =

Scientific classification
- Domain: Eukaryota
- Kingdom: Animalia
- Phylum: Arthropoda
- Class: Insecta
- Order: Coleoptera
- Suborder: Polyphaga
- Infraorder: Cucujiformia
- Family: Curculionidae
- Genus: Arhines

Synonyms
- Arhinus Schönherr, 1833; Arrhines Agassiz, 1846; Arrhines Gemminger & Harold, 1871

Genus of beetles

Arhines is a genus of beetles belonging to the family Curculionidae.

Species:

- Arhines callizonatus Fairmaire, 1873
- Arhines hirtus Faust, 1893
- Arhines languidus Gyllenhal, 1834
- Arhines posthumus Boheman, 1843
- Arhines tutus Faust, 1894
