= Oedophrys =

Scientific classification
- Kingdom: Animalia
- Phylum: Arthropoda
- Class: Insecta
- Order: Coleoptera
- Suborder: Polyphaga
- Infraorder: Cucujiformia
- Family: Curculionidae
- Genus: Oedophrys; Marshall, 1941

Species of weevil

Oedophrys is a genus of true weevils in the beetle family Curculionidae. There are about six described species in Oedophrys, found in eastern Asia and eastern North America.

== Species ==
These species belong to the genus Oedophrys:

- Oedophrys albofasciata Pajni, 1990
- Oedophrys convexifrons (Faust, 1897)
- Oedophrys deludens Marshall, 1941
- Oedophrys multituberculata Pajni, 1990
- Oedophrys rudis Marshall, 1941
- Oedophrys rufiscutallata Pajni, 1990
