= Aracanthus =

Scientific classification
- Kingdom: Animalia
- Phylum: Arthropoda
- Class: Insecta
- Order: Coleoptera
- Suborder: Polyphaga
- Infraorder: Cucujiformia
- Family: Curculionidae
- Tribe: Eudiagogini
- Genus: Aracanthus; Say, 1831

Genus of beetles

Aracanthus is a genus of broad-nosed weevils in the beetle family Curculionidae. There are about nine described species in Aracanthus.

== Species ==
These nine species belong to the genus Aracanthus:

- Aracanthus assimilis Voss, 1934^{i c g}
- Aracanthus mourei Rosado-Neto, 1981^{c g}
- Aracanthus notatus Voss, 1934^{c g}
- Aracanthus ovalis Voss, 1934^{c g}
- Aracanthus pallidus (Say, 1831)^{i c g b}
- Aracanthus paraguayanus Voss, 1943^{c g}
- Aracanthus robustus Voss, 1934^{c g}
- Aracanthus signatus Voss, 1934^{c g}
- Aracanthus tabaci Voss, 1934^{c g}

Data sources: i = ITIS, c = Catalogue of Life, g = GBIF, b = Bugguide.net
