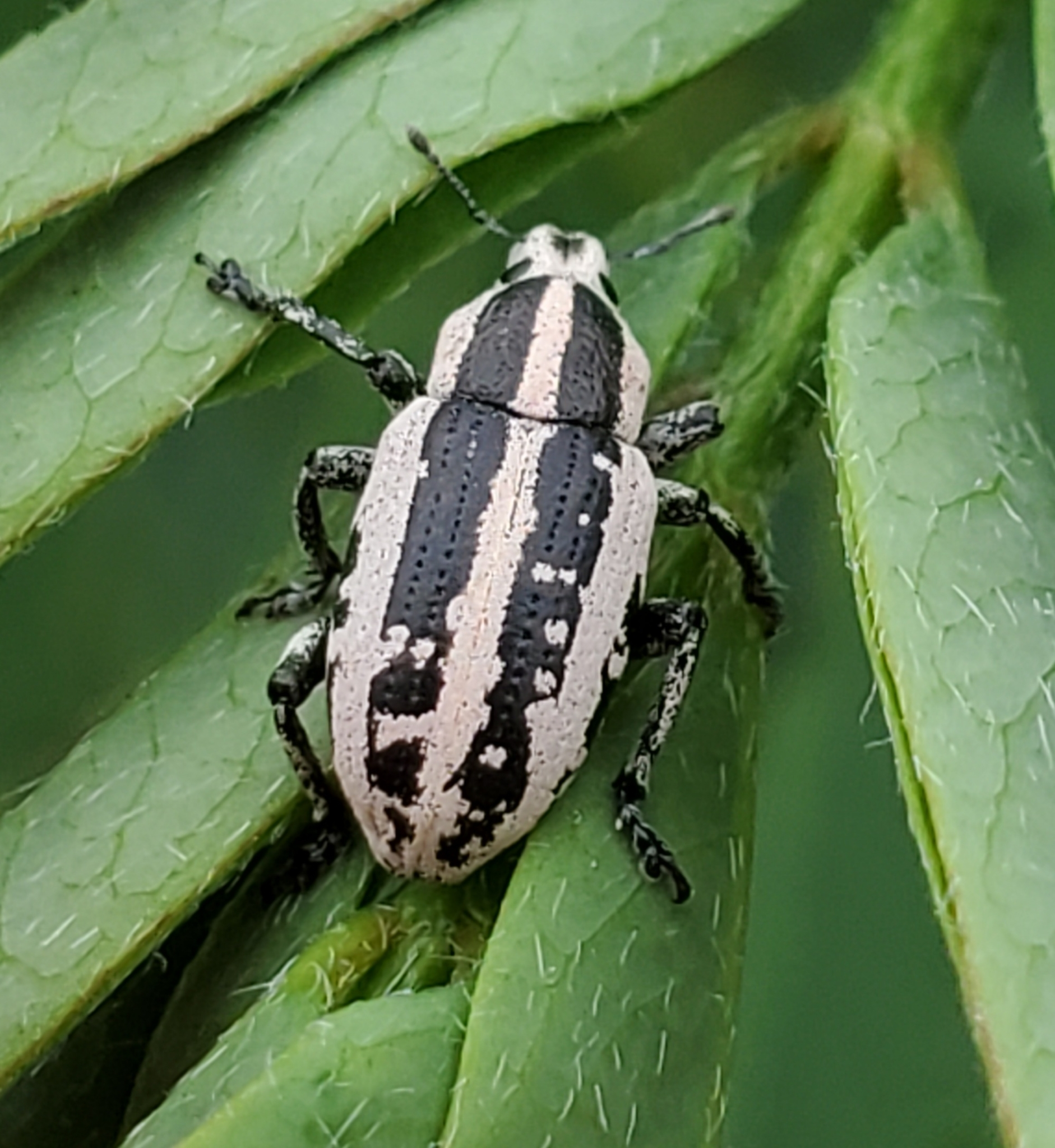

Scientific classification
- Domain: Eukaryota
- Kingdom: Animalia
- Phylum: Arthropoda
- Class: Insecta
- Order: Coleoptera
- Suborder: Polyphaga
- Infraorder: Cucujiformia
- Family: Curculionidae
- Genus: Eudiagogus
- Species: E. rosenschoeldi

Binomial name
- Eudiagogus rosenschoeldi Fahraeus, 1840

Synonyms
- Eudius albolimbatus Chevrolat, 1881

= Eudiagogus rosenschoeldi =

Species of beetle

Eudiagogus rosenschoeldi is a species of broad-nosed weevil in the beetle family Curculionidae. It is found in North America.
