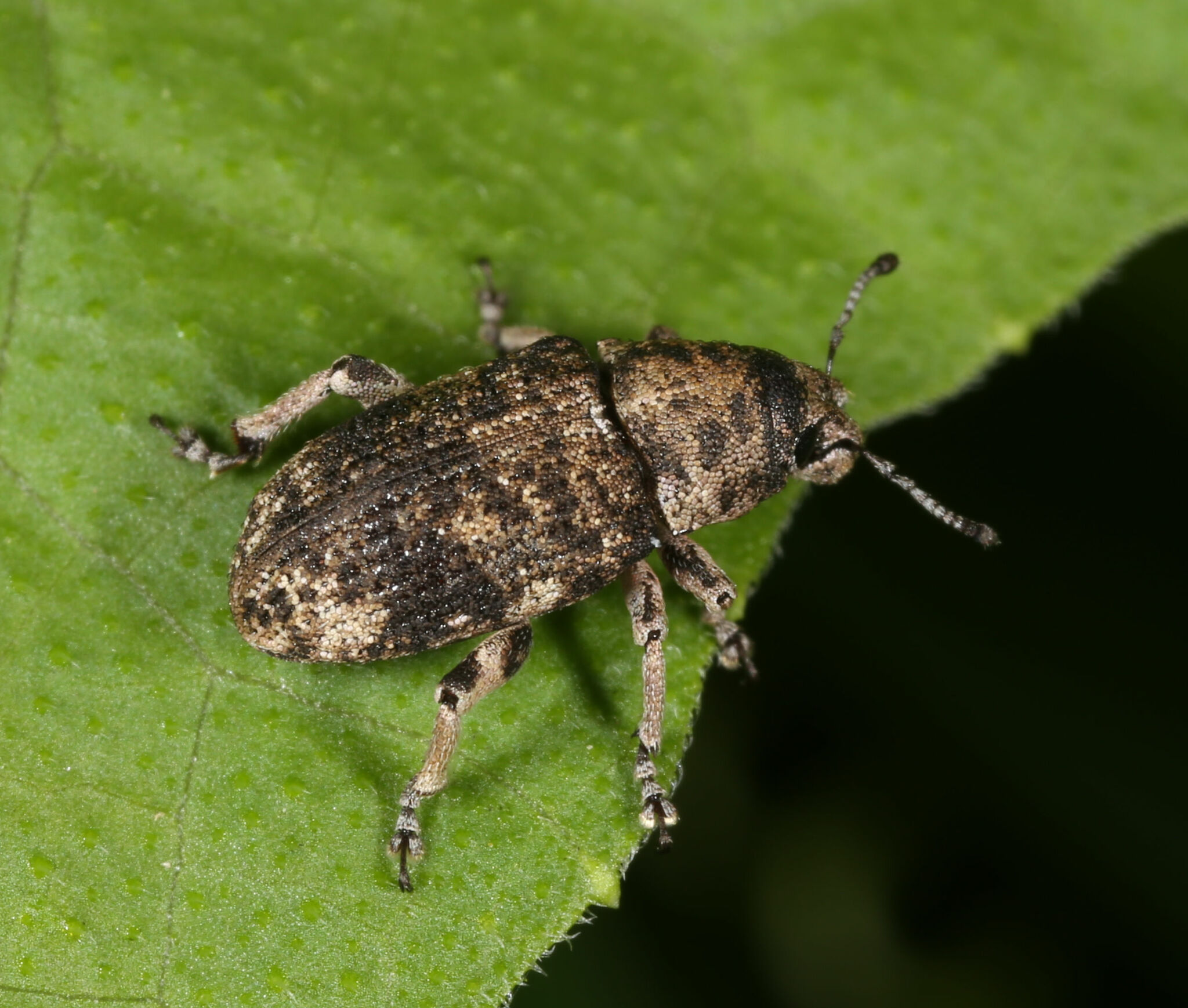

Scientific classification
- Kingdom: Animalia
- Phylum: Arthropoda
- Class: Insecta
- Order: Coleoptera
- Suborder: Polyphaga
- Infraorder: Cucujiformia
- Family: Curculionidae
- Genus: Colecerus
- Species: C. dispar

Binomial name
- Colecerus dispar (LeConte, 1874)

= Colecerus dispar =

Species of beetle

Colecerus dispar is a species of broad-nosed weevil in the beetle family Curculionidae. It is found in North America.
