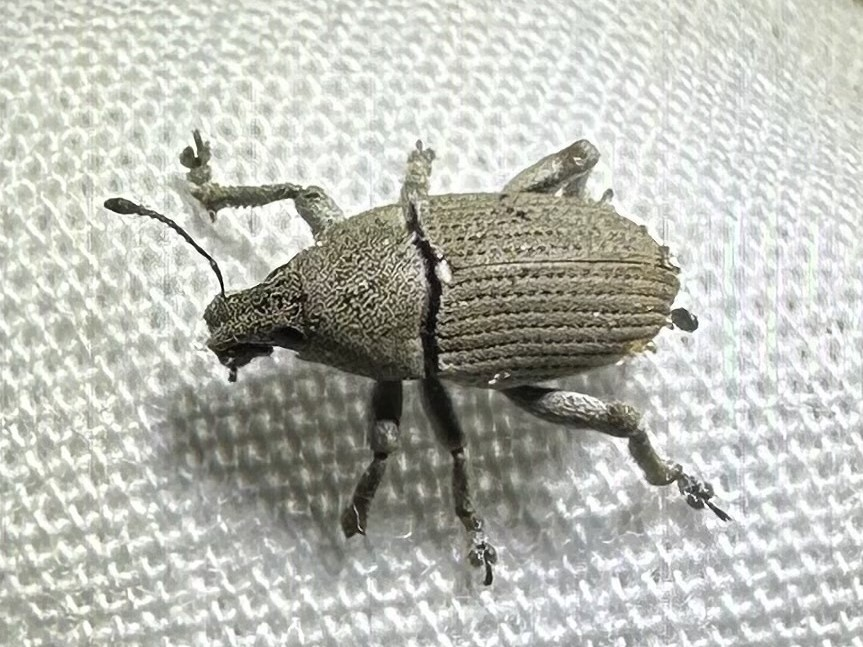
- Colecerus virescens

Scientific classification
- Domain: Eukaryota
- Kingdom: Animalia
- Phylum: Arthropoda
- Class: Insecta
- Order: Coleoptera
- Suborder: Polyphaga
- Infraorder: Cucujiformia
- Family: Curculionidae
- Tribe: Eudiagogini
- Genus: Colecerus; Schönherr, 1840

= Colecerus =

Genus of beetles

Colecerus is a genus of broad-nosed weevils in the beetle family Curculionidae. There are about nine described species in the genus Colecerus.

== Species ==
These nine species belong to the genus Colecerus:

- Colecerus albidus Chevrolat, 1881^{c g}
- Colecerus crassipes Champion, 1911^{c g}
- Colecerus denticollis Champion, 1911^{c g}
- Colecerus dispar (LeConte, 1874)^{i c g b}
- Colecerus marmoratus (Horn, 1876)^{i c g b} (Texas marbled weevil)
- Colecerus rotundicollis Champion, 1911^{c g}
- Colecerus setosus Boheman, 1840^{c g}
- Colecerus variegatus Boheman, 1845^{c g}
- Colecerus virescens Champion, 1911^{c g}

Data sources: i = ITIS, c = Catalogue of Life, g = GBIF, b = Bugguide.net
