= Eudiagogini =

Scientific classification
- Kingdom: Animalia
- Phylum: Arthropoda
- Class: Insecta
- Order: Coleoptera
- Suborder: Polyphaga
- Infraorder: Cucujiformia
- Family: Curculionidae
- Subfamily: Entiminae
- Tribe: Eudiagogini; LeConte, 1874

Genera
- See text

Tribe of beetles

Eudiagogini is a weevil tribe in the subfamily Entiminae.

== Genera ==
Aetherhinus – Aracanthus – Chileudius – Colecerus – Eucoleocerus – Eudiagogus – Eudius – Eudomus – Eurpsaces – Oligocryptus – Pororhynchus – Promecops
