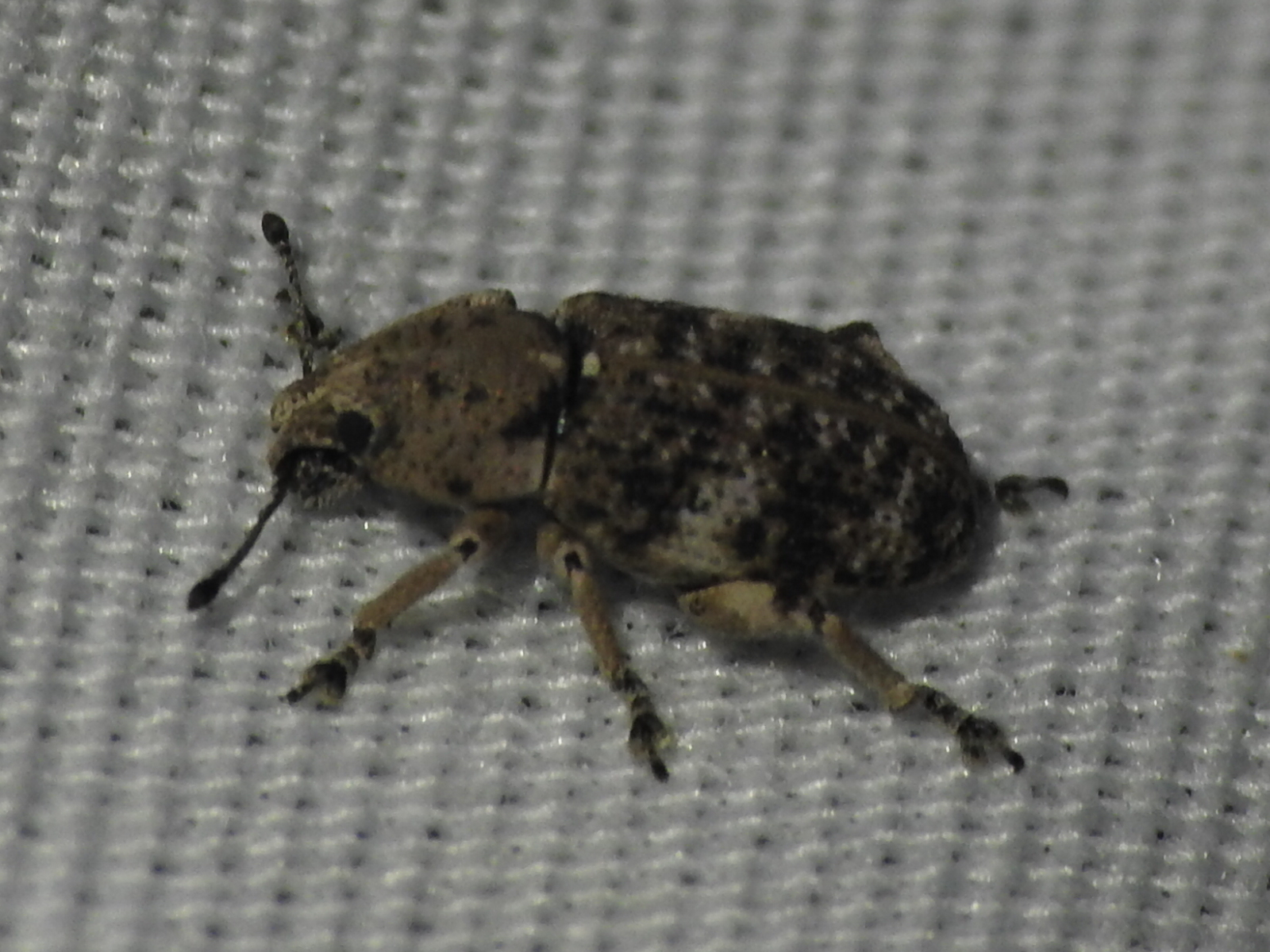

Scientific classification
- Domain: Eukaryota
- Kingdom: Animalia
- Phylum: Arthropoda
- Class: Insecta
- Order: Coleoptera
- Suborder: Polyphaga
- Infraorder: Cucujiformia
- Family: Curculionidae
- Genus: Colecerus
- Species: C. marmoratus

Binomial name
- Colecerus marmoratus (Horn, 1876)

= Colecerus marmoratus =

Species of beetle

Colecerus marmoratus, the Texas marbled weevil, is a species of broad-nosed weevil in the beetle family Curculionidae. It is found in North America.
