= Aracanthus pallidus =

Scientific classification
- Domain: Eukaryota
- Kingdom: Animalia
- Phylum: Arthropoda
- Class: Insecta
- Order: Coleoptera
- Suborder: Polyphaga
- Infraorder: Cucujiformia
- Family: Curculionidae
- Genus: Aracanthus
- Species: A. pallidus

Binomial name
- Aracanthus pallidus (Say, 1831)

Species of weevil

Aracanthus pallidus is a species of broad-nosed weevil in the beetle family Curculionidae. It is found in North America.
