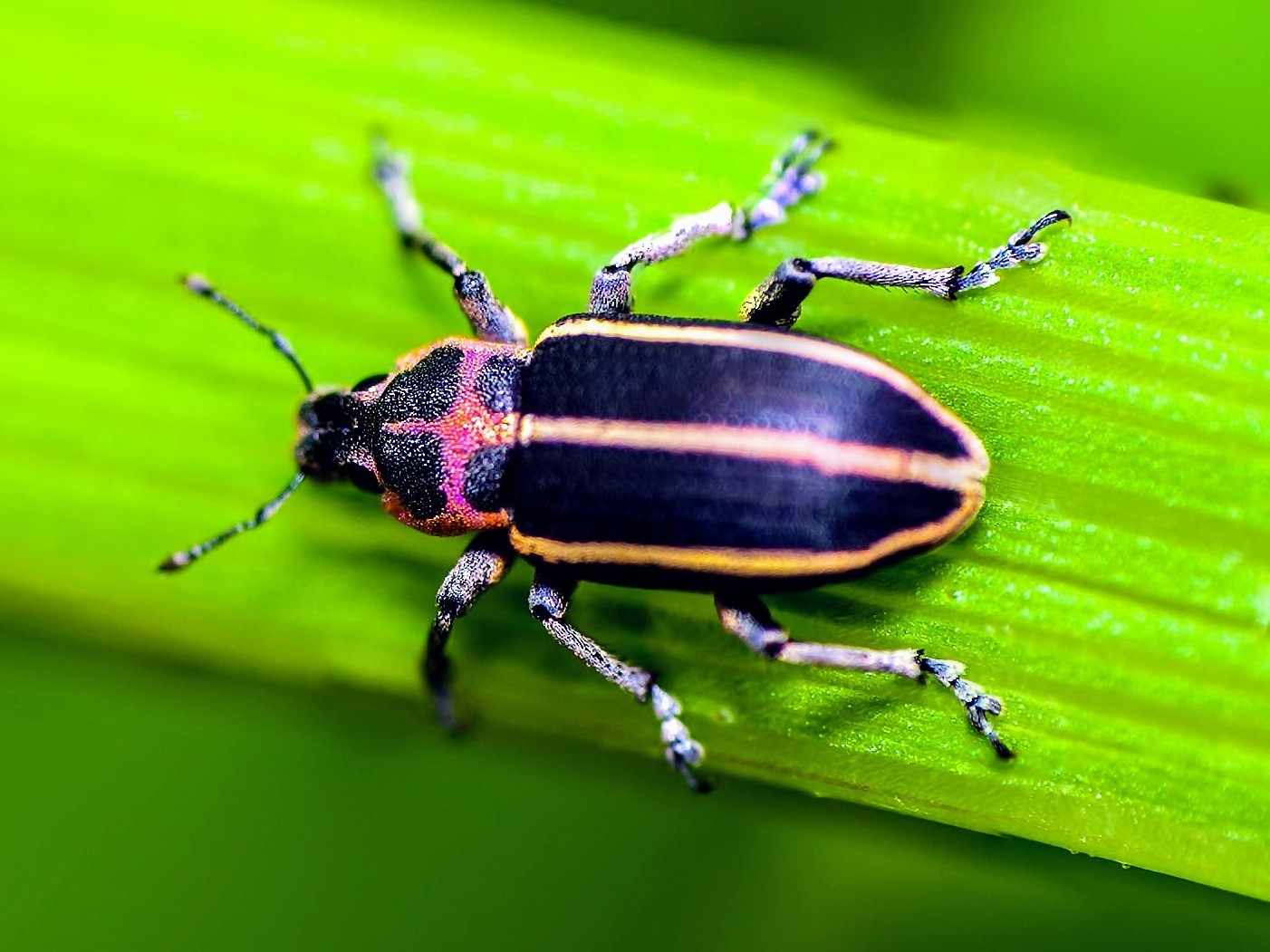

Scientific classification
- Domain: Eukaryota
- Kingdom: Animalia
- Phylum: Arthropoda
- Class: Insecta
- Order: Coleoptera
- Suborder: Polyphaga
- Infraorder: Cucujiformia
- Family: Curculionidae
- Genus: Eudiagogus
- Species: E. maryae

Binomial name
- Eudiagogus maryae Warner, 1979

= Eudiagogus maryae =

Species of beetle

Eudiagogus maryae is a species of broad-nosed weevil in the beetle family Curculionidae. It is found in North America.
