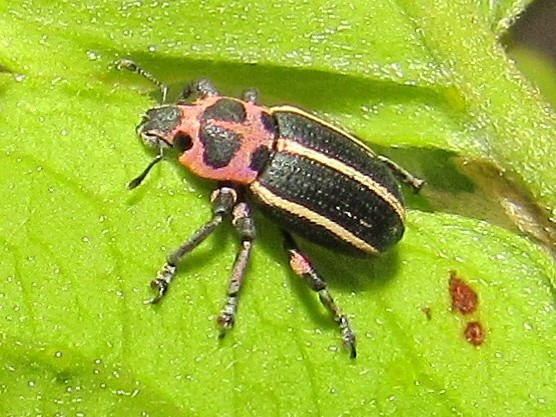
- Eudiagogus episcopalis

Scientific classification
- Kingdom: Animalia
- Phylum: Arthropoda
- Class: Insecta
- Order: Coleoptera
- Suborder: Polyphaga
- Infraorder: Cucujiformia
- Family: Curculionidae
- Tribe: Eudiagogini
- Genus: Eudiagogus; Schönherr, 1840

= Eudiagogus =

Genus of beetles

Eudiagogus is a genus in the beetle family Curculionidae. They are commonly known as Sesbania clown weevils, in reference to the food-plants of the genus Sesbania.

== Species ==
These species belong to the genus Eudiagogus:

- Eudiagogus episcopalis (Gyllenhal, 1834)
- Eudiagogus maryae Warner, 1979
- Eudiagogus pallidevittatus Lucas, 1857
- Eudiagogus pulcher Fahraeus, 1840 (beautiful clown weevil)
- Eudiagogus rosenschoeldi Fahraeus, 1840
- Eudiagogus stenosoma O’Brien & Kovarik, 2000
