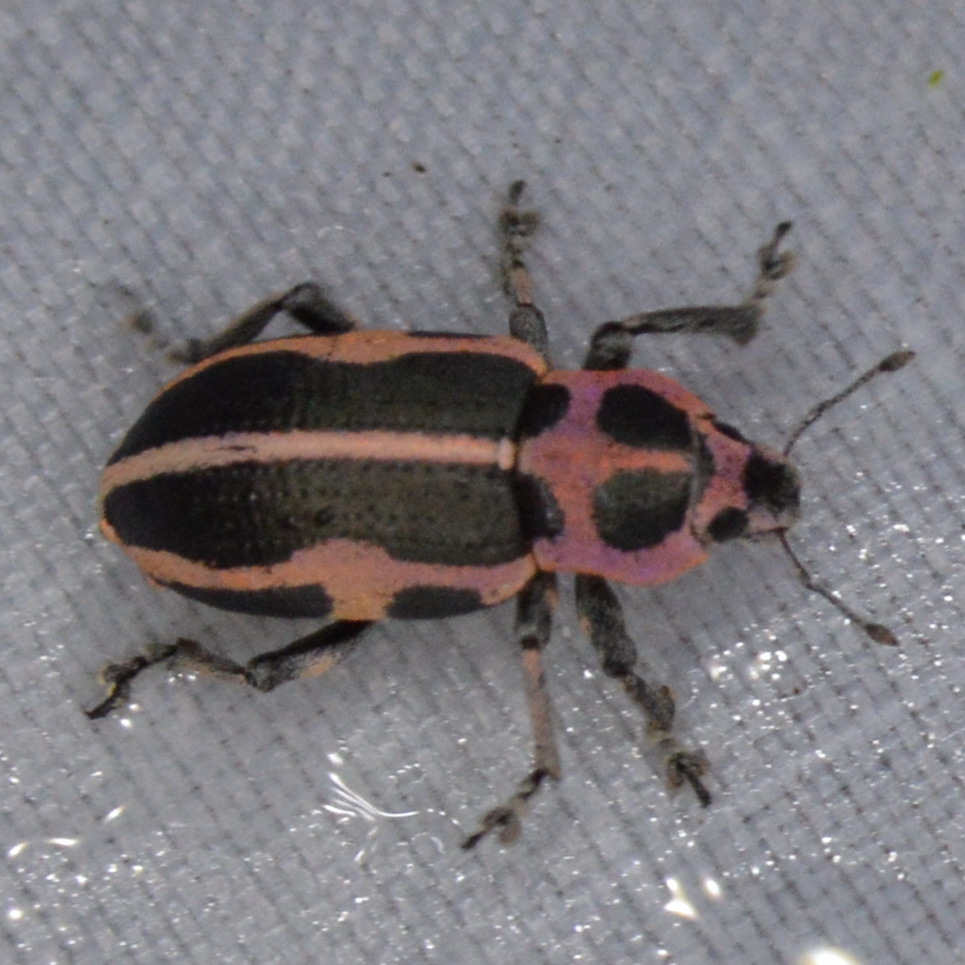

Scientific classification
- Domain: Eukaryota
- Kingdom: Animalia
- Phylum: Arthropoda
- Class: Insecta
- Order: Coleoptera
- Suborder: Polyphaga
- Infraorder: Cucujiformia
- Family: Curculionidae
- Genus: Eudiagogus
- Species: E. pulcher

Binomial name
- Eudiagogus pulcher Fahraeus, 1840

Synonyms
- Eudiagogus pogo Warner, 1979

= Eudiagogus pulcher =

Species of beetle

Eudiagogus pulcher, the sesbania clown weevil, is a species of broad-nosed weevil in the beetle family Curculionidae. It is found in North America.
