= Episomus figuratus =

Scientific classification
- Kingdom: Animalia
- Phylum: Arthropoda
- Class: Insecta
- Order: Coleoptera
- Suborder: Polyphaga
- Infraorder: Cucujiformia
- Family: Curculionidae
- Genus: Episomus
- Species: E. figuratus

Binomial name
- Episomus figuratus Karsch, 1882

Synonyms
- Episomus annulipes Chevrolat, 1883; Episomus ceylonicus Faust, 1897

Species of beetle

Episomus figuratus is a species of weevil found in Sri Lanka.

== Description ==
This species has a body length is about 11.5 to 16 mm. Body black, where the dorsum covered with dense light or dark brown scales variegated with pale spots. Margins of the thorax and elytra with pale blue, or greenish, or whitish scales. Head with a broad central furrows. Rostrum broad, and roundly dilated towards apex. Scutellum small. Elytra elongate, ovate, with sharply acuminate apex. Legs densely covered with greenish or grey scales. In tibiae, there is a darker median patch.
