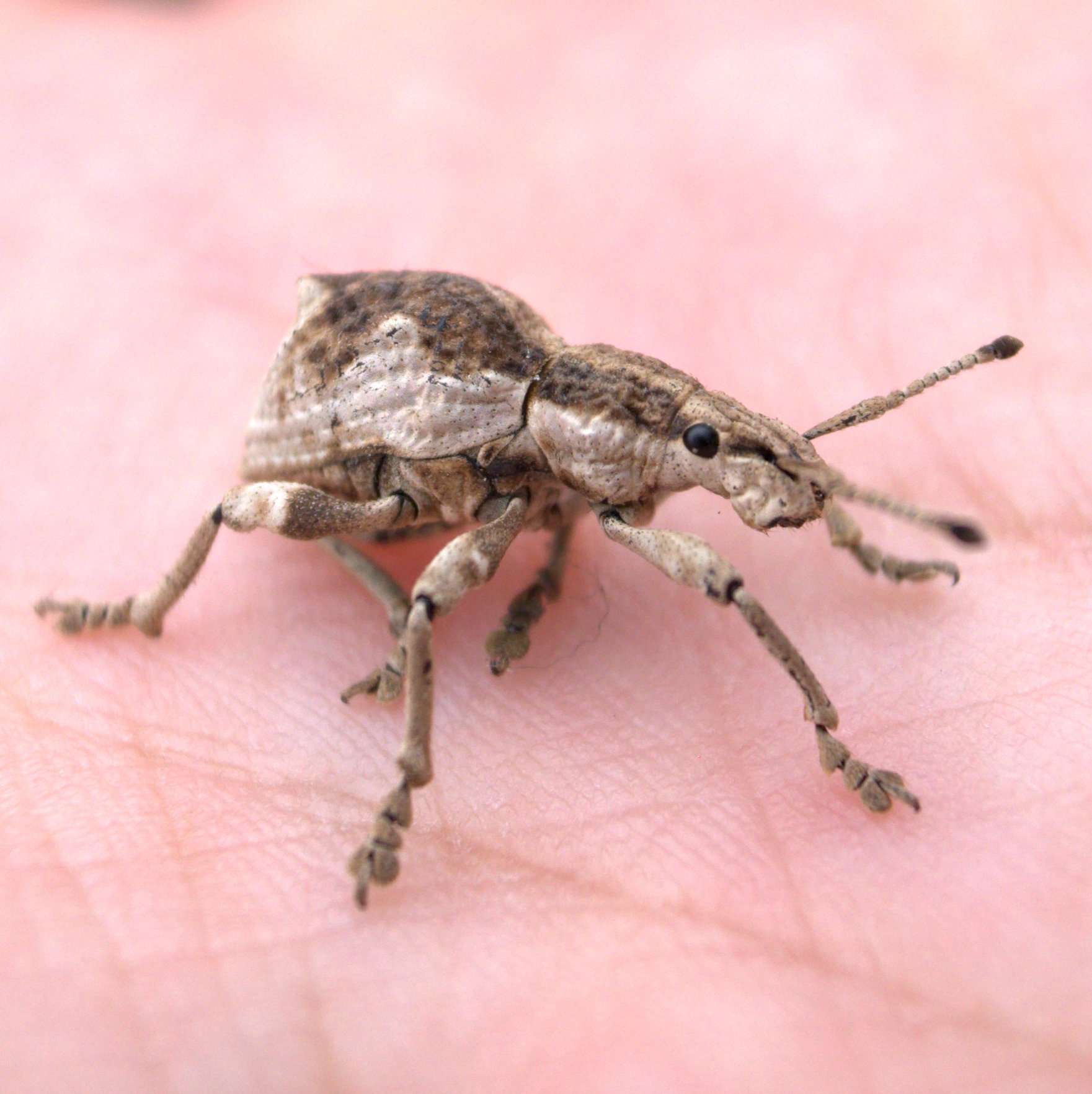
- Episomus turritus
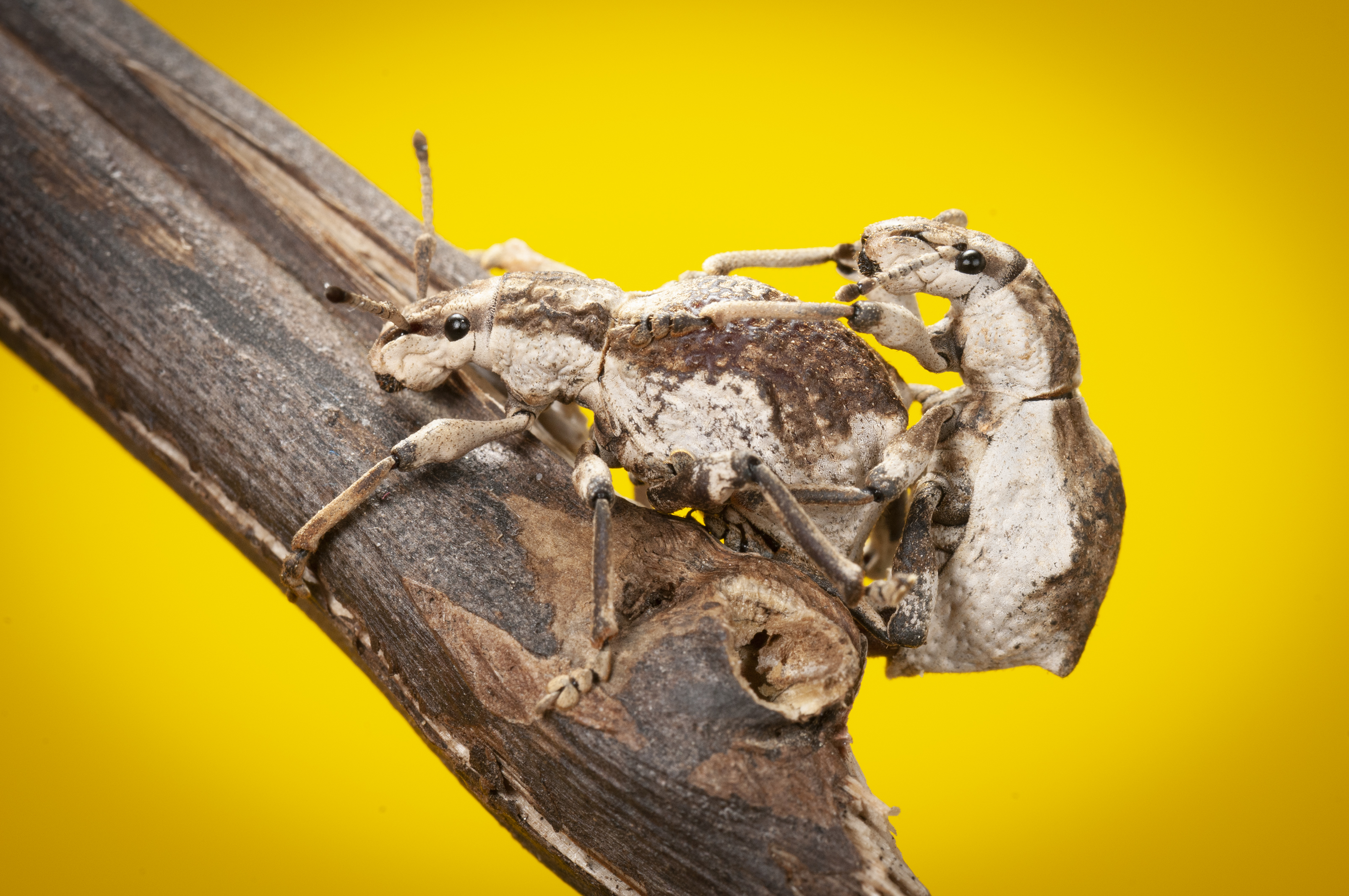
- Episomus turritus, Adult, South Korea

Scientific classification
- Kingdom: Animalia
- Phylum: Arthropoda
- Clade: Pancrustacea
- Class: Insecta
- Order: Coleoptera
- Suborder: Polyphaga
- Infraorder: Cucujiformia
- Superfamily: Curculionoidea
- Family: Curculionidae
- Tribe: Episomini
- Genus: Episomus; Schönherr, 1823

Type species
- Curculio avarus Fabricius, 1801

Diversity
- About 106 species

Synonyms
- Epizomus Kono, 1928; Simallus Pascoe, 1865

= Episomus =

Genus of beetles

Episomus is a genus of beetles belonging to the family Curculionidae. Species are distributed throughout Sri Lanka, India, Myanmar, Thailand, Malay Peninsula, Sumatra, Java, Borneo, Philippines, China and Japan, Pacific Northwest of America. Many species are considered economically important, as they are pests of field beans, cotton and pigeon pea.

== Description ==
Body variable in size and shape generally elongate, broad, and ovate. Vestiture varies from brown or metallic green. Some species are greenish or black. Three kind of scales are present: the predominant usually oval and the less predominant ones more elongate or plumose. Dorsum of many species is brown. Head with a central furrow and a more or less distinct transverse impression behind the eye. Eyes are convex, lateral, prominent, and very short ovate. Scrobes are very deep in front, but shallower near the eyes. Rostrum broader than the forehead. Mandibles obtuse, prominent and with a strongly marked scar. Antennae with scape exceeding the hind margin of the eye. Antennae geniculate and consist of a scape, a seven segmented funicle.

Prothorax usually with strong transverse plications and a more or less distinct central furrow. Prothorax base is either bisinuate or subtruncate. Scutellum variable, and usually well developed. Elytra not soldered together and with or without a distinct humeral angle. Elytral base slightly covering the basal margin of the prothorax. Legs stout, and elongate with unarmed femora. Epistome forming a sharp acute angle behind. Sternum with the fore coxae nearer the anterior margin of the prosternum. Ventrum varied with light brown, grey with white, black or metallic green.

== Species ==
- Episomus aemulus Faust, 1897 - Malaysia
- Episomus albarius Faust, 1897 - Indonesia
- Episomus andrewesi Marshall, 1916 - India
- Episomus apicalis Chevrolat, 1883 - Malaysia
- Episomus appendiculatus Faust, 1897 - India, China, Malaysia
- Episomus arcuatus Marshall, 1916 - India
- Episomus arduus Marshall, 1916 - India
- Episomus arrogans Boheman, 1842 - India, Myanmar
- Episomus avuncularius Marshall, 1916 - India
- Episomus bicuspis Marshall, 1916 - Myanmar
- Episomus bilineatus Chevrolat, 1883 - Malaysia, Singapore
- Episomus binodosus Chevrolat, 1883 - Malaysia
- Episomus brevipennis Faust, 1897 - Myanmar
- Episomus castelnaui Faust, 1897 - Malaysia
- Episomus celebensis Faust, 1895 - Indonesia
- Episomus chlorostigma (Wiedemann, 1819) - Indonesia
- Episomus cochinchinensis Faust, 1897 - Vietnam
- Episomus connexus Marshall, 1916 - Myanmar
- Episomus decipiens Marshall, 1916 - India
- Episomus dejeani Faust, 1897 - India
- Episomus distans Faust, 1897 - Indonesia
- Episomus distinguendus Faust, 1897 - Indonesia
- Episomus diutinus Faust, 1897 - Indonesia
- Episomus dohertyi Marshall, 1916 - India
- Episomus dorsalis Faust, 1897 - Indonesia
- Episomus exaratus Faust, 1897 - Indonesia
- Episomus fabriciusi Faust, 1897 - India
- Episomus fausti Hartmann, 1900 - Indonesia
- Episomus figulus Boheman, 1834 - India, Indonesia
- Episomus figuratus Karsch, 1882 - Sri Lanka
- Episomus fimbriatus Pascoe, 1871 - Malaysia, Sri Lanka, Indonesia
- Episomus fortius Voss, 1937 - China
- Episomus frenatus Marshall, 1916 - India
- Episomus freyi Zumpt, 1937 - China
- Episomus gracilicornis Ritsema, 1882 - Indonesia
- Episomus gryphus Faust, 1897 - Indonesia
- Episomus guttatus Boheman, 1845 - India, Myanmar, Malaysia
- Episomus gyllenhali Faust, 1897 - Indonesia
- Episomus humeralis Chevrolat, 1883 - Indonesia, Bangladesh, India
- Episomus iconicus Pascoe, 1871 - Cambodia
- Episomus illustris Faust, 1897 - Malaysia, Singapore
- Episomus incisipes Chevrolat, 1883 - Malaysia
- Episomus incomptus Faust, 1897 - Philippines
- Episomus inermicollis Marshall, 1916 - India
- Episomus intercalaris Faust, 1897 - Indonesia
- Episomus irregularis Marshall, 1916 - India
- Episomus kraatzi Faust, 1895 - Malaysia, Indonesia
- Episomus kwanhsiensis Heller, 1923 - China
- Episomus lacerta (Fabricius, 1781) - Indonesia, India
- Episomus laticollis Pascoe, 1887 - Thailand
- Episomus lentus Erichson, 1834 - Philippines
- Episomus limbaticollis Marshall, 1916 - Myanmar
- Episomus lucidus Hartmann, 1900 - Indonesia
- Episomus malaccensis Faust, 1897 - Malaysia
- Episomus manipurensis Marshall, 1916 - India
- Episomus marshalli Heller, 1908 - Vietnam
- Episomus montanus Guerin, 1843 - India
- Episomus mori Kono, 1928 - Japan
- Episomus mundus Sharp, 1896 - Japan
- Episomus nebulosus Marshall, 1916 - India
- Episomus nigropustulatus Faust, 1894 - Myanmar
- Episomus nilgirinus Heller, 1908 - India
- Episomus nobilis Faust, 1895 - Malaysia, Indonesia
- Episomus obesulus (Faust, 1897) - Cambodia
- Episomus obliquus Marshall, 1916 - Myanmar
- Episomus oblongus Marshall, 1916 - Myanmar
- Episomus obstrusus Marshall, 1916 - Myanmar
- Episomus obuncus Marshall, 1916 - India
- Episomus omisiensis Heller, 1923 - China
- Episomus parallelus Chevrolat, 1883 - Vietnam
- Episomus pauperatus (Fabricius, 1801) - Indonesia, Malaysia
- Episomus platina (Sparrmann, 1785) - Indonesia, Vietnam
- Episomus praecanus Faust, 1897 - Indonesia
- Episomus profanus Faust, 1894 - Myanmar
- Episomus pudibundus Faust, 1894 - Myanmar
- Episomus pudicus Faust, 1897 - Malaysia, Indonesia
- Episomus pyriformis Marshall, 1916 - Sri Lanka
- Episomus quadrimaculatus Marshall, 1916 - India
- Episomus quatuornotatus Desbrochers des Loges, 1890 - India
- Episomus raucus Faust, 1897 - India
- Episomus repandus Faust, 1894 - Myanmar, Cambodia
- Episomus sagax Faust, 1897 - India, Bangladesh
- Episomus saitus Faust, 1897 - Indonesia
- Episomus sennae Faust, 1894 - Myanmar
- Episomus siamensis Faust, 1897 - Malaysia, Cambodia, Thailand
- Episomus simulator Faust, 1897 - Indonesia, Malaysia
- Episomus singularis Faust, 1897 - Thailand
- Episomus sobrinus Faust, 1897 - Malaysia
- Episomus stellio Snellen Van Vollenhoven, 1864 - Indonesia
- Episomus suavis Faust, 1897 - Malaysia
- Episomus subnitens Marshall, 1916 - Indonesia, Myanmar
- Episomus subtuberculatus Heller, 1922 - Vietnam
- Episomus sulcicollis (Pascoe, 1865) - Myanmar
- Episomus takahashi Kono, 1928 - Taiwan
- Episomus timidus Faust, 1897 - Malaysia, Indonesia
- Episomus tristiculus Voss, 1958 - Taiwan
- Episomus truncatirostris (Fairmaire, 1889) - China
- Episomus turritus (Gyllenhal, 1833) - Japan, China, Korea
- Episomus uncatus Faust, 1897 - Malaysia, Indonesia
- Episomus uniformis Pascoe, 1887 - India
- Episomus versutus Faust, 1895 - Myanmar, India
- Episomus vethi Hartmann, 1914 - Indonesia
- Episomus viriosus Faust, 1897 - Indonesia
- Episomus watanabei Kono, 1932 - Taiwan
- Episomus wiedemanni Faust, 1897 - Indonesia
- Episomus yunnanensis Voss, 1937 - China
