= Episomus pyriformis =

Scientific classification
- Kingdom: Animalia
- Phylum: Arthropoda
- Class: Insecta
- Order: Coleoptera
- Suborder: Polyphaga
- Infraorder: Cucujiformia
- Family: Curculionidae
- Genus: Episomus
- Species: E. pyriformis

Binomial name
- Episomus pyriformis Marshall, 1916

Species of beetle

Episomus pyriformis is a species of weevil found in Sri Lanka.

== Description ==
This species has a body length is about 9.5 to 11.5 mm. Body greyish brown. Margins of elytra are paler. Sometimes there are traces of metallic green scales. Head with a deep narrow furrow. The rostrum is broad and slightly dilated towards the apex. Prothorax is as long as broad, and cylindrical. Scutellum small and round. Elytra were pear-shaped. Legs with uniform pale scales.
