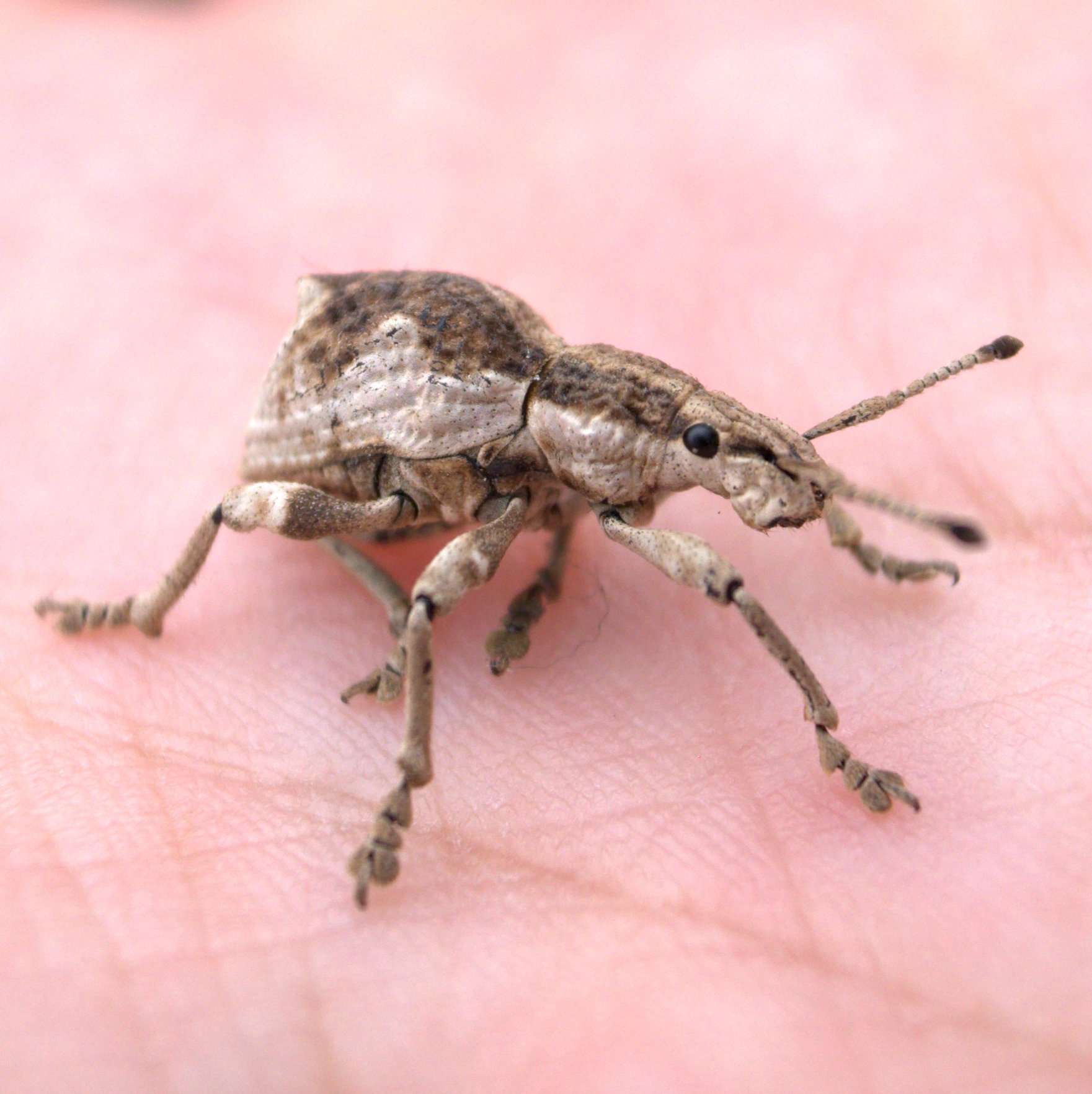
- Episomus turritus

Scientific classification
- Domain: Eukaryota
- Kingdom: Animalia
- Phylum: Arthropoda
- Class: Insecta
- Order: Coleoptera
- Suborder: Polyphaga
- Infraorder: Cucujiformia
- Family: Curculionidae
- Subfamily: Entiminae
- Tribe: Episomini; Lacordaire, 1863

Genera
- See text

= Episomini =

Tribe of beetles

Episomini is a weevil tribe in the subfamily Entiminae.

== Genera ==
Bethaeus – Catamonas – Ceratocrates – Chaunoderus – Demenica – Epilaris – Episomus – Lachnotarsus – Parapionus – Platyomicus
