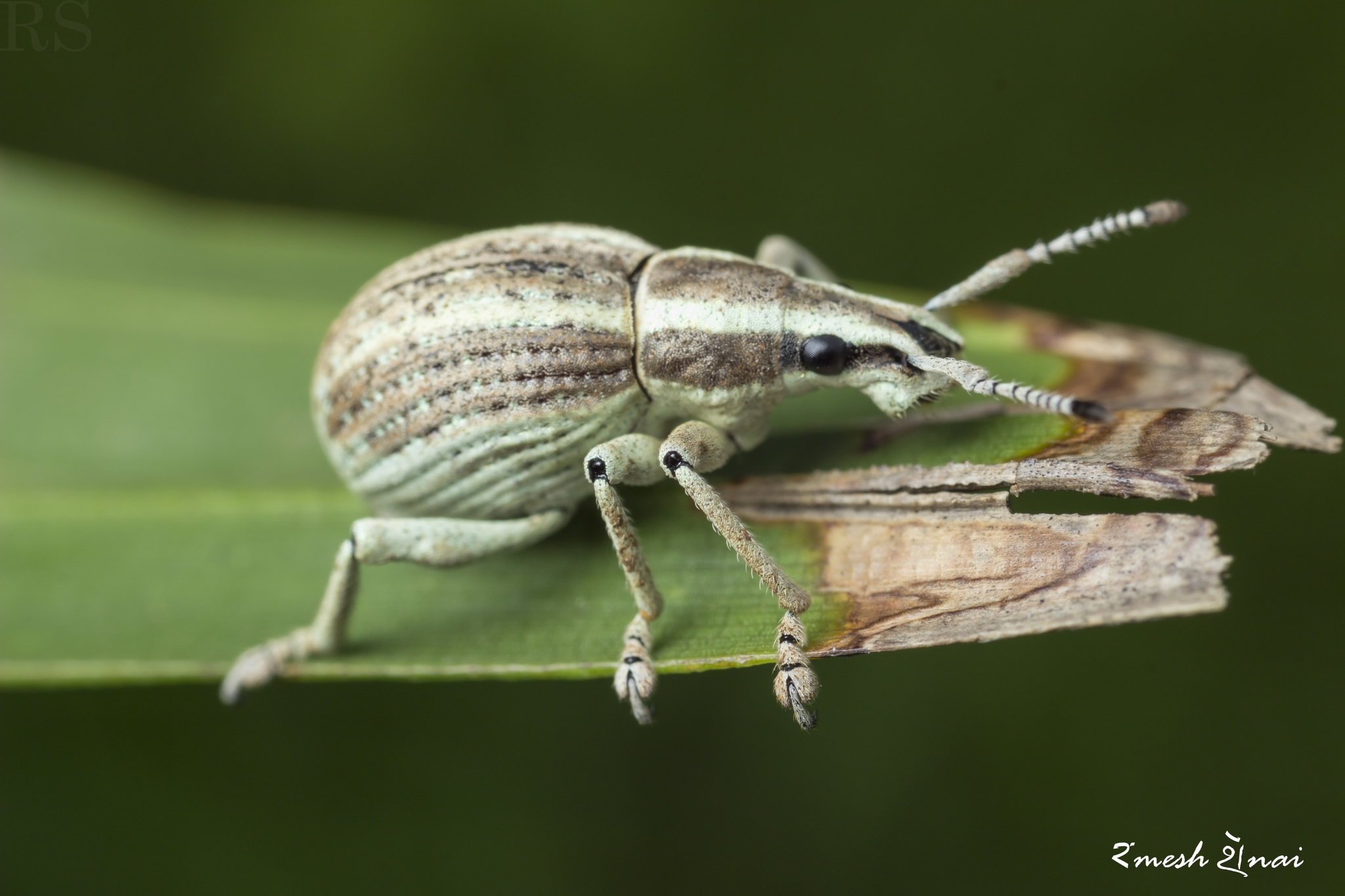

Scientific classification
- Kingdom: Animalia
- Phylum: Arthropoda
- Class: Insecta
- Order: Coleoptera
- Suborder: Polyphaga
- Infraorder: Cucujiformia
- Family: Curculionidae
- Tribe: Episomini
- Genus: Parapionus; Marshall, 1916
- Species: P. varicolor

Binomial name
- Parapionus varicolor Marshall, 1916

= Parapionus =

Species of beetle

Parapionus varicolor is a species of beetle belonging to the weevil family Curculionidae. It is the only species in the genus Parapionus, in the tribe Episomini. It is found in the Indian state of Maharashtra.
