= Ophryastes desertus =

Scientific classification
- Domain: Eukaryota
- Kingdom: Animalia
- Phylum: Arthropoda
- Class: Insecta
- Order: Coleoptera
- Suborder: Polyphaga
- Infraorder: Cucujiformia
- Family: Curculionidae
- Genus: Ophryastes
- Species: O. desertus

Binomial name
- Ophryastes desertus (Horn, 1876)

Synonyms
- Eupagoderes californicus Ting, 1939; Eupagoderes giganteus Chittenden, 1926

Species of beetle

Ophryastes desertus is a species of broad-nosed weevil in the beetle family Curculionidae. It is found in North America.
