= Ophryastes nivosus =

Scientific classification
- Domain: Eukaryota
- Kingdom: Animalia
- Phylum: Arthropoda
- Class: Insecta
- Order: Coleoptera
- Suborder: Polyphaga
- Infraorder: Cucujiformia
- Family: Curculionidae
- Genus: Ophryastes
- Species: O. nivosus

Binomial name
- Ophryastes nivosus (Fall, 1910)

Synonyms
- Eupagoderes marmoratus Fall, 1910

Species of beetle

Ophryastes nivosus is a species of broad-nosed weevil in the beetle family Curculionidae. It is found in North America.
