= Ophryastes ovalis =

Scientific classification
- Domain: Eukaryota
- Kingdom: Animalia
- Phylum: Arthropoda
- Class: Insecta
- Order: Coleoptera
- Suborder: Polyphaga
- Infraorder: Cucujiformia
- Family: Curculionidae
- Genus: Ophryastes
- Species: O. ovalis

Binomial name
- Ophryastes ovalis (Pierce, 1909)

Species of beetle

Ophryastes ovalis is a species of broad-nosed weevil in the beetle family Curculionidae. It is found in North America.
