= Ophryastes turbinatus =

Scientific classification
- Domain: Eukaryota
- Kingdom: Animalia
- Phylum: Arthropoda
- Class: Insecta
- Order: Coleoptera
- Suborder: Polyphaga
- Infraorder: Cucujiformia
- Family: Curculionidae
- Genus: Ophryastes
- Species: O. turbinatus

Binomial name
- Ophryastes turbinatus (Champion, 1911)

Species of beetle

Ophryastes turbinatus is a species in the subfamily Entiminae ("broad-nosed weevils"), in the suborder Polyphaga ("water, rove, scarab, long-horned, leaf and snout beetles"). It is found in North America.
