= Ophryastes tuberosus =

Scientific classification
- Domain: Eukaryota
- Kingdom: Animalia
- Phylum: Arthropoda
- Class: Insecta
- Order: Coleoptera
- Suborder: Polyphaga
- Infraorder: Cucujiformia
- Family: Curculionidae
- Genus: Ophryastes
- Species: O. tuberosus

Binomial name
- Ophryastes tuberosus LeConte, 1853

Synonyms
- Ophryastes basalis Sharp, 1891; Ophryastes bituberosus Sharp, 1891; Ophryastes collaris Champion, 1911; Ophryastes tetralobus Champion, 1911

Species of beetle

Ophryastes tuberosus is a species of broad-nosed weevil in the beetle family Curculionidae. It is found in North America.
