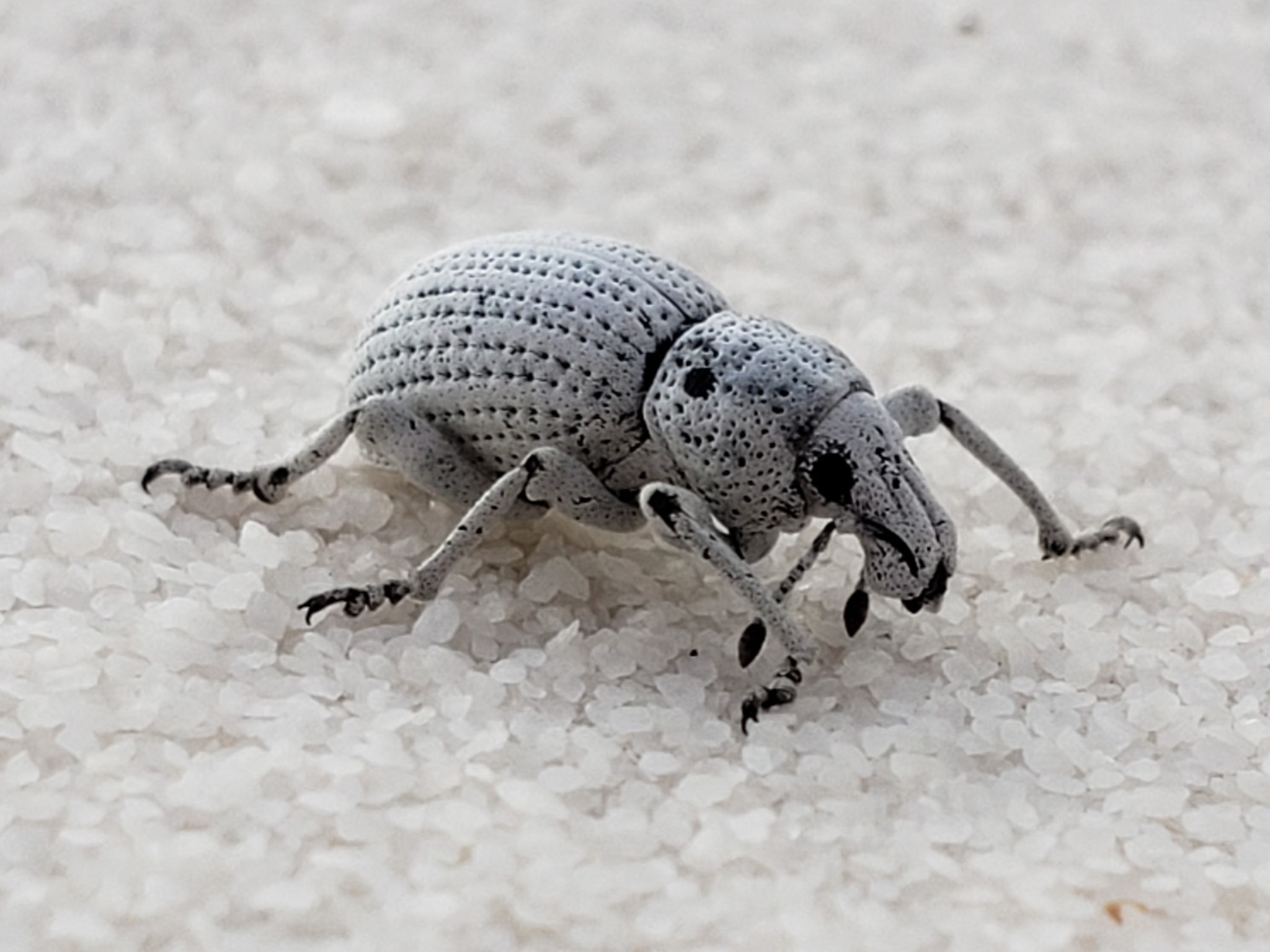

Scientific classification
- Domain: Eukaryota
- Kingdom: Animalia
- Phylum: Arthropoda
- Class: Insecta
- Order: Coleoptera
- Suborder: Polyphaga
- Infraorder: Cucujiformia
- Family: Curculionidae
- Subfamily: Entiminae
- Tribe: Ophryastini
- Genus: Ophryastes; Germar, 1829

= Ophryastes =

Genus of beetles

Ophryastes is a genus of broad-nosed weevils in the family Curculionidae. There are at least 30 described species in Ophryastes.

== Species ==
- Ophryastes aeneus (Davis, 1947)
- Ophryastes argentatus LeConte, 1853
- Ophryastes aridus (Fall, 1910)
- Ophryastes avius Kissinger, 1970
- Ophryastes bryanti (Van Dyke, 1951)
- Ophryastes cinerascens (Pierce, 1913)
- Ophryastes cinereus Fahraeus, 1840
- Ophryastes decipiens LeConte, 1853
- Ophryastes desertus (Horn, 1876)
- Ophryastes dunnianus (Casey, 1888)
- Ophryastes geminatus (Horn, 1876)
- Ophryastes globularis (Pierce, 1909)
- Ophryastes griseus (Davis, 1947)
- Ophryastes huachucae (Van Dyke, 1934)
- Ophryastes latirostris LeConte, 1853
- Ophryastes mixtus Kissinger, 1970
- Ophryastes nivosus (Fall, 1910)
- Ophryastes ovalis (Pierce, 1909)
- Ophryastes ovipennis Sharp, 1891
- Ophryastes pilosus (Davis, 1947)
- Ophryastes reburrus Kissinger, 1970
- Ophryastes robustus (Davis, 1947)
- Ophryastes rotundatus (Champion, 1911)
- Ophryastes setosus (Van Dyke, 1934)
- Ophryastes shufeldti Casey, 1888
- Ophryastes simulans (Van Dyke, 1934)
- Ophryastes sordidus LeConte, 1853
- Ophryastes speciosus LeConte, 1853
- Ophryastes sulcirostris (Say, 1824)
- Ophryastes symmetricus Fall, 1907
- Ophryastes tuberosus LeConte, 1853
- Ophryastes turbinatus (Champion, 1911)
- Ophryastes variabilis (Pierce, 1913)
- Ophryastes varius LeConte, 1853
- Ophryastes vittatus (Say, 1824)
