= Ophryastes ovipennis =

Scientific classification
- Kingdom: Animalia
- Phylum: Arthropoda
- Class: Insecta
- Order: Coleoptera
- Suborder: Polyphaga
- Infraorder: Cucujiformia
- Family: Curculionidae
- Genus: Ophryastes
- Species: O. ovipennis

Binomial name
- Ophryastes ovipennis Sharp, 1891

Species of beetle

Ophryastes ovipennis is a species of broad-nosed weevil in the beetle family Curculionidae. It is found in North America.
