= Ophryastes vittatus =

Scientific classification
- Domain: Eukaryota
- Kingdom: Animalia
- Phylum: Arthropoda
- Class: Insecta
- Order: Coleoptera
- Suborder: Polyphaga
- Infraorder: Cucujiformia
- Family: Curculionidae
- Genus: Ophryastes
- Species: O. vittatus

Binomial name
- Ophryastes vittatus (Say, 1824)

Species of beetle

Ophryastes vittatus is a species of broad-nosed weevil in the beetle family Curculionidae. It is found in North America.
