= Ophryastes latirostris =

Scientific classification
- Domain: Eukaryota
- Kingdom: Animalia
- Phylum: Arthropoda
- Class: Insecta
- Order: Coleoptera
- Suborder: Polyphaga
- Infraorder: Cucujiformia
- Family: Curculionidae
- Genus: Ophryastes
- Species: O. latirostris

Binomial name
- Ophryastes latirostris LeConte, 1853

Synonyms
- Dystirus strumosus Pascoe, 1872; Ophryastes latipennis Sharp, 1891; Ophryastes sulcipennis Casey, 1888; Ophryastes validus LeConte, 1856

Species of beetle

Ophryastes latirostris is a species of broad-nosed weevil in the beetle family Curculionidae. It is found in North America.
