= Ophryastes geminatus =

Scientific classification
- Domain: Eukaryota
- Kingdom: Animalia
- Phylum: Arthropoda
- Class: Insecta
- Order: Coleoptera
- Suborder: Polyphaga
- Infraorder: Cucujiformia
- Family: Curculionidae
- Genus: Ophryastes
- Species: O. geminatus

Binomial name
- Ophryastes geminatus (Horn, 1876)

Synonyms
- Eupagoderes approximatus Davis, 1947; Eupagoderes hardyi Tanner, 1939; Eupagoderes mortivallis Fall, 1910; Eupagoderes plumbeus Horn, 1876; Eupagoderes utahensis Tanner, 1939

Species of beetle

Ophryastes geminatus is a species of broad-nosed weevil in the beetle family Curculionidae. It is found in North America.
