= Ophryastes sordidus =

Scientific classification
- Kingdom: Animalia
- Phylum: Arthropoda
- Class: Insecta
- Order: Coleoptera
- Suborder: Polyphaga
- Infraorder: Cucujiformia
- Family: Curculionidae
- Genus: Ophryastes
- Species: O. sordidus

Binomial name
- Ophryastes sordidus LeConte, 1853

Synonyms
- Eupagoderes cretaceus Sharp, 1891; Eupagoderes halli Van Dyke, 1934

Species of beetle

Ophryastes sordidus is a species of broad-nosed weevil in the family Curculionidae. It is found in North America.
