= Ophryastes argentatus =

Scientific classification
- Domain: Eukaryota
- Kingdom: Animalia
- Phylum: Arthropoda
- Class: Insecta
- Order: Coleoptera
- Suborder: Polyphaga
- Infraorder: Cucujiformia
- Family: Curculionidae
- Genus: Ophryastes
- Species: O. argentatus

Binomial name
- Ophryastes argentatus LeConte, 1853

Species of beetle

Ophryastes argentatus is a species of broad-nosed weevil in the beetle family Curculionidae. It is found in North America.
