= Hormorus =

Scientific classification
- Domain: Eukaryota
- Kingdom: Animalia
- Phylum: Arthropoda
- Class: Insecta
- Order: Coleoptera
- Suborder: Polyphaga
- Infraorder: Cucujiformia
- Family: Curculionidae
- Subfamily: Entiminae
- Tribe: Hormorini
- Genus: Hormorus; Horn, 1876

Genus of beetles

Hormorus is a genus of broad-nosed weevils in the beetle family Curculionidae. There are at least two described species in Hormorus.

== Species ==
These two species belong to the genus Hormorus:

- Hormorus saxorum Scudder, 1893^{c g}
- Hormorus undulatus (Uhler, 1856)^{i c g b} (lily of the valley weevil)

Data sources: i = ITIS, c = Catalogue of Life, g = GBIF, b = Bugguide.net
