= Agasphaerops =

Scientific classification
- Kingdom: Animalia
- Phylum: Arthropoda
- Clade: Pancrustacea
- Class: Insecta
- Order: Coleoptera
- Suborder: Polyphaga
- Infraorder: Cucujiformia
- Superfamily: Curculionoidea
- Family: Curculionidae
- Subfamily: Entiminae
- Tribe: Hormorini
- Genus: Agasphaerops; Horn, 1876

Genus of beetles

Agasphaerops is a genus of broad-nosed weevils in the beetle family Curculionidae. There are at least two described species in Agasphaerops.

== Species ==
These two species belong to the genus Agasphaerops:

- Agasphaerops niger Horn, 1876^{g}
- Agasphaerops nigra Horn, 1876^{i c g b} (lily weevil)

Data sources: i = ITIS, c = Catalogue of Life, g = GBIF, b = Bugguide.net
