= Agasphaerops nigra =

Scientific classification
- Domain: Eukaryota
- Kingdom: Animalia
- Phylum: Arthropoda
- Class: Insecta
- Order: Coleoptera
- Suborder: Polyphaga
- Infraorder: Cucujiformia
- Family: Curculionidae
- Genus: Agasphaerops
- Species: A. nigra

Binomial name
- Agasphaerops nigra Horn, 1876

Synonyms
- Panscopus sulcirostris Pierce, 1913

Species of weevil beetle

Agasphaerops nigra, the lily weevil, is a species of broad-nosed weevil in the beetle family Curculionidae. It is found in North America.
