= Hormorini =

Scientific classification
- Kingdom: Animalia
- Phylum: Arthropoda
- Clade: Pancrustacea
- Class: Insecta
- Order: Coleoptera
- Suborder: Polyphaga
- Infraorder: Cucujiformia
- Superfamily: Curculionoidea
- Family: Curculionidae
- Subfamily: Entiminae
- Tribe: Hormorini; Horn, 1876

Genera
- See text

Tribe of beetles

Hormorini is a weevil tribe in the subfamily Entiminae.

== Genera ==
Agasphaerops – Andringitrabius – Anillobius – Brachymycterus – Esmelina – Eusomostrophus – Evadodes – Evadomorpha – Evas – Genavius – Guineobius – Holcorhinosoma – Hormorus – Isopterus – Lathrotiorrhynchus – Leptorhinus – Lupinocolus – Myogalus – Ochrometa – Styliscus – Styreus
