= Hormorus undulatus =

Scientific classification
- Domain: Eukaryota
- Kingdom: Animalia
- Phylum: Arthropoda
- Class: Insecta
- Order: Coleoptera
- Suborder: Polyphaga
- Infraorder: Cucujiformia
- Family: Curculionidae
- Genus: Hormorus
- Species: H. undulatus

Binomial name
- Hormorus undulatus (Uhler, 1856)

Species of beetle

Hormorus undulatus, the lily of the valley weevil, is a species of broad-nosed weevil in the beetle family Curculionidae. It is found in North America.
