= Lupinocolus =

Scientific classification
- Domain: Eukaryota
- Kingdom: Animalia
- Phylum: Arthropoda
- Class: Insecta
- Order: Coleoptera
- Suborder: Polyphaga
- Infraorder: Cucujiformia
- Family: Curculionidae
- Subfamily: Entiminae
- Tribe: Hormorini
- Genus: Lupinocolus; Van Dyke, 1936

Genus of beetles

Lupinocolus is a genus of broad-nosed weevils in the beetle family Curculionidae. There is at least one described species in Lupinocolus, L. blaisdelli.
