= List of weevil (Curculionoidea) species recorded in Great Britain =

The following is a list of the weevils recorded in Great Britain. For other beetles, see List of beetle species recorded in Britain.

== Orthoceri Schönherr, 1823 ==
Family Nemonychidae Bedel, 1882

- Cimberis attelaboides (Fabricius, 1787)

Family Anthribidae Billberg, 1820

- Anthribus fasciatus (Forster, 1771)
- Anthribus nebulosus (Forster, 1771)
- Platyrhinus resinosus (Scopoli, 1763)
- Platystomos albinus (Linnaeus, 1758)
- Enedreytes sepicola (Fabricius, 1793)
- Dissoleucas niveirostris (Fabricius, 1798)
- Choragus sheppardi Kirby, 1819
- Araecerus fasciculatus (De Geer, 1775)
- Bruchela rufipes (Olivier, 1790)

Family Rhynchitidae Gistel, 1848

- Involvulus caeruleus (De Geer, 1775)
- Involvulus cupreus (Linnaeus, 1758)
- Lasiorhynchites cavifrons (Gyllenhal, 1833)
- Lasiorhynchites olivaceus (Gyllenhal, 1833)
- Neocoenorrhinus aeneovirens (Marsham, 1802)
- Neocoenorrhinus aequatus (Linnaeus, 1767)
- Neocoenorrhinus germanicus (Herbst, 1797)
- Neocoenorrhinus interpunctatus (Stephens, 1831)
- Neocoenorrhinus pauxillus (Germar, 1824)
- Rhynchites auratus (Scopoli, 1763)
- Rhynchites bacchus (Linnaeus, 1758)
- Temnocerus longiceps (C. G. Thomson, 1888)
- Temnocerus nanus (Paykull, 1792)
- Temnocerus tomentosus (Gyllenhal, 1839)
- Byctiscus betulae (Linnaeus, 1758)
- Byctiscus populi (Linnaeus, 1758)
- Deporaus betulae (Linnaeus, 1758)
- Deporaus mannerheimii (Hummel, 1823)

Family Attelabidae Billberg, 1820

- Attelabus nitens (Scopoli, 1763)
- Apoderus coryli (Linnaeus, 1758)

Family Apionidae Schönherr, 1823

- Apion cruentatum Walton, 1844
- Apion frumentarium (Linnaeus, 1758)
- Apion haematodes Kirby, 1808
- Apion rubens Stephens, 1839
- Apion rubiginosum Grill, 1893
- Aizobius sedi (Germar, 1818)
- Helianthemapion aciculare (Germar, 1817)
- Perapion affine (Kirby, 1808)
- Perapion curtirostre (Germar, 1817)
- Perapion hydrolapathi (Marsham, 1802)
- Perapion marchicum (Herbst, 1797)
- Perapion violaceum (Kirby, 1808)
- Perapion lemoroi (Brisout, Ch., 1880)
- Pseudaplemonus limonii (Kirby, 1808)
- Aspidapion radiolus (Marsham, 1802)
- Aspidapion soror (Rey, 1895)
- Aspidapion aeneum (Fabricius, 1775)
- Acentrotypus brunnipes (Boheman, 1839)
- Ceratapion armatum (Gerstäcker, 1854)
- Ceratapion carduorum (Kirby, 1808)
- Ceratapion gibbirostre (Gyllenhal, 1813)
- Ceratapion onopordi (Kirby, 1808)
- Diplapion confluens (Kirby, 1808)
- Diplapion stolidum (Germar, 1817)
- Omphalapion beuthini (Hoffmann, Anton, 1874)
- Omphalapion hookerorum (Kirby, 1808)
- Omphalapion laevigatum (Paykull, 1792)
- Exapion difficile (Herbst, 1797)
- Exapion fuscirostre (Fabricius, 1775)
- Exapion genistae (Kirby, 1811)
- Exapion ulicis (Forster, 1771)
- Ixapion variegatum (Wencker, 1864)
- Kalcapion pallipes (Kirby, 1808)
- Kalcapion semivittatum (Gyllenhal, 1833)
- Melanapion minimum (Herbst, 1797)
- Squamapion atomarium (Kirby, 1808)
- Squamapion cineraceum (Wencker, 1864)
- Squamapion flavimanum (Gyllenhal, 1833)
- Squamapion vicinum (Kirby, 1808)
- Taeniapion urticarium (Herbst, 1784)
- Malvapion malvae (Fabricius, 1775)
- Pseudapion rufirostre (Fabricius, 1775)
- Rhopalapion longirostre (Olivier, 1807)
- Cyanapion spencii (Kirby, 1808)
- Cyanapion afer (Gyllenhal, 1833)
- Cyanapion gyllenhalii (Kirby, 1808)
- Eutrichapion ervi (Kirby, 1808)
- Eutrichapion viciae (Paykull, 1800)
- Eutrichapion vorax (Herbst, 1797)
- Eutrichapion punctigerum (Paykull, 1792)
- Hemitrichapion reflexum (Gyllenhal, 1833)
- Hemitrichapion waltoni (Stephens, 1839)
- Holotrichapion ononis (Kirby, 1808)
- Holotrichapion pisi (Fabricius, 1801)
- Holotrichapion aethiops (Herbst, 1797)
- Oxystoma cerdo (Gerstäcker, 1854)
- Oxystoma craccae (Linnaeus, 1767)
- Oxystoma pomonae (Fabricius, 1798)
- Oxystoma subulatum (Kirby, 1808)
- Pirapion immune (Kirby, 1808)
- Catapion curtisi (Stephens, 1831)
- Catapion pubescens (Kirby, 1811)
- Catapion seniculus (Kirby, 1808)
- Ischnopterapion loti (Kirby, 1808)
- Ischnopterapion modestum (Germar, 1817)
- Ischnopterapion virens (Herbst, 1797)
- Protopirapion atratulum (Germar, 1817)
- Stenopterapion intermedium (Eppelsheim, 1875)
- Stenopterapion meliloti (Kirby, 1808)
- Stenopterapion tenue (Kirby, 1808)
- Stenopterapion scutellare (Kirby, 1811)
- Synapion ebeninum (Kirby, 1808)
- Betulapion simile (Kirby, 1811)
- Protapion apricans (Herbst, 1797)
- Protapion assimile (Kirby, 1808)
- Protapion difforme (Germar, 1818)
- Protapion dissimile (Germar, 1817)
- Protapion filirostre (Kirby, 1808)
- Protapion fulvipes (Geoffroy in Fourcroy, 1785)
- Protapion laevicolle (Kirby, 1811)
- Protapion nigritarse (Kirby, 1808)
- Protapion ononidis (Gyllenhal, 1827)
- Protapion ryei (Blackburn, 1874)
- Protapion schoenherri (Boheman, 1839)
- Protapion trifolii (Linnaeus, 1768)
- Protapion varipes (Germar, 1817)
- Pseudoprotapion astragali (Paykull, 1800)

Family Nanophyidae Gistel, 1856

- Dieckmanniellus gracilis (Redtenbacher, 1849)
- Nanophyes marmoratus (Goeze, 1777)

Family Dryophthoridae Schönherr, 1825

- Dryophthorus corticalis (Paykull, 1792)
- Sitophilus granarius (Linnaeus, 1758)
- Sitophilus oryzae (Linnaeus, 1763)
- Sitophilus zeamais Motschulsky, 1855

Family Erirhinidae Schönherr, 1825

- Grypus equiseti (Fabricius, 1775)
- Notaris acridulus (Linnaeus, 1758)
- Notaris aethiops (Fabricius, 1793)
- Notaris scirpi (Fabricius, 1793)
- Procas granulicollis Walton, 1848
- Procas picipes (Marsham, 1802)
- Thryogenes festucae (Herbst, 1795)
- Thryogenes fiorii Zumpt, 1928
- Thryogenes nereis (Paykull, 1800)
- Thryogenes scirrhosus (Gyllenhal, 1836)
- Tournotaris bimaculata (Fabricius, 1787)
- Stenopelmus rufinasus Gyllenhal, 1836

Family Raymondionymidae Reitter, 1912

- Ferreria marqueti (Aubé, 1863)

== Gonatoceri Schönherr, 1825 ==
Family Curculionidae Latreille, 1802

- Archarius pyrrhoceras (Marsham, 1802)
- Archarius salicivorus (Paykull, 1792)
- Curculio betulae (Stephens, 1831)
- Curculio glandium Marsham, 1802
- Curculio nucum Linnaeus, 1758
- Curculio rubidus (Gyllenhal, 1836)
- Curculio venosus (Gravenhorst, 1807)
- Curculio villosus (Fabricius, 1781)
- Acalyptus carpini (Fabricius, 1793)
- Anthonomus bituberculatus C. G. Thomson, 1868
- Anthonomus brunnipennis (Curtis, 1840)
- Anthonomus chevrolati Desbrochers, 1868
- Anthonomus conspersus Desbrochers, 1868
- Anthonomus humeralis (Panzer, 1795)
- Anthonomus pedicularius (Linnaeus, 1758)
- Anthonomus piri Kollar, 1837
- Anthonomus pomorum (Linnaeus, 1758)
- Anthonomus rubi (Herbst, 1795)
- Anthonomus rufus Gyllenhal, 1836
- Anthonomus ulmi (De Geer, 1775)
- Anthonomus varians (Paykull, 1792)
- Anthonomus rectirostris (Linnaeus, 1758)
- Brachonyx pineti (Paykull, 1792)
- Cionus alauda (Herbst, 1784)
- Cionus hortulanus (Fourcroy, 1785)
- Cionus longicollis Brisout, Ch., 1863
- Cionus nigritarsis Reitter, 1904
- Cionus scrophulariae (Linnaeus, 1758)
- Cionus tuberculosus (Scopoli, 1763)
- Cleopus pulchellus (Herbst, 1795)
- Ellescus bipunctatus (Linnaeus, 1758)
- Dorytomus affinis (Paykull, 1800)
- Dorytomus dejeani Faust, 1882
- Dorytomus filirostris (Gyllenhal, 1836)
- Dorytomus hirtipennis Bedel, 1884
- Dorytomus ictor (Herbst, 1795)
- Dorytomus longimanus (Forster, 1771)
- Dorytomus majalis (Paykull, 1792)
- Dorytomus melanophthalmus (Paykull, 1792)
- Dorytomus rufatus (Bedel, 1888)
- Dorytomus salicinus (Gyllenhal, 1827)
- Dorytomus salicis Walton, 1851
- Dorytomus taeniatus (Fabricius, 1781)
- Dorytomus tortrix (Linnaeus, 1761)
- Dorytomus tremulae (Fabricius, 1787)
- Cleopomiarus graminis (Gyllenhal, 1813)
- Cleopomiarus micros (Germar, 1821)
- Cleopomiarus plantarum (Germar, 1824)
- Gymnetron beccabungae (Linnaeus, 1761)
- Gymnetron melanarium (Germar, 1821)
- Gymnetron rostellum (Herbst, 1795)
- Gymnetron veronicae (Germar, 1821)
- Gymnetron villosulum Gyllenhal, 1838
- Mecinus circulatus (Marsham, 1802)
- Mecinus collaris Germar, 1821
- Mecinus janthinus Germar, 1821
- Mecinus labilis (Herbst, 1795)
- Mecinus pascuorum (Gyllenhal, 1813)
- Mecinus pyraster (Herbst, 1795)
- Miarus campanulae (Linnaeus, 1767)
- Rhinusa antirrhini (Paykull, 1800)
- Rhinusa collina (Gyllenhal, 1813)
- Rhinusa linariae (Panzer, 1795)
- Isochnus foliorum (O. F. Müller, 1764)
- Isochnus sequensi (Stierlin, 1894)
- Orchestes alni (Linnaeus, 1758)
- Orchestes calceatus (Germar, 1821)
- Orchestes iota (Fabricius, 1787)
- Orchestes pilosus (Fabricius, 1781)
- Orchestes quercus (Linnaeus, 1758)
- Orchestes rusci (Herbst, 1795)
- Orchestes signifer (Creutzer, 1799)
- Orchestes testaceus (O. F. Müller, 1776)
- Orchestes fagi (Linnaeus, 1758)
- Pseudorchestes pratensis (Germar, 1821)
- Rhamphus oxyacanthae (Marsham, 1802)
- Rhamphus pulicarius (Herbst, 1795)
- Rhamphus subaeneus Illiger, 1807
- Rhynchaenus lonicerae (Herbst, 1795)
- Tachyerges decoratus (Germar, 1821)
- Tachyerges pseudostigma (Tempère, 1982)
- Tachyerges salicis (Linnaeus, 1758)
- Tachyerges stigma (Germar, 1821)
- Smicronyx coecus (Reich, 1797)
- Smicronyx jungermanniae (Reich, 1797)
- Smicronyx reichi (Gyllenhal, 1836)
- Pachytychius haematocephalus (Gyllenhal, 1836)
- Orthochaetes insignis (Aubé, 1863)
- Orthochaetes setiger (Beck, 1817)
- Pseudostyphlus pillumus (Gyllenhal, 1836)
- Sibinia arenariae Stephens, 1831
- Sibinia primita (Herbst, 1795)
- Sibinia pyrrhodactyla (Marsham, 1802)
- Sibinia sodalis Germar, 1824
- Tychius breviusculus Desbrochers, 1873
- Tychius crassirostris Kirsch, 1871
- Tychius junceus (Reich, 1797)
- Tychius lineatulus Stephens, 1831
- Tychius meliloti Stephens, 1831
- Tychius parallelus (Panzer, 1794)
- Tychius picirostris (Fabricius, 1787)
- Tychius polylineatus (Germar, 1824)
- Tychius pusillus Germar, 1842
- Tychius quinquepunctatus (Linnaeus, 1758)
- Tychius schneideri (Herbst, 1795)
- Tychius squamulatus Gyllenhal, 1836
- Tychius stephensi Gyllenhal, 1836
- Tychius tibialis Boheman, 1843
- Bagous argillaceus Gyllenhal, 1836
- Bagous binodulus (Herbst, 1795)
- Bagous brevis Gyllenhal, 1836
- Bagous collignensis (Herbst, 1797)
- Bagous czwalinae Seidlitz, 1891
- Bagous diglyptus Boheman, 1845
- Bagous frit (Herbst, 1795)
- Bagous limosus (Gyllenhal, 1827)
- Bagous longitarsis C. G. Thomson, 1868
- Bagous lutulosus (Gyllenhal, 1827)
- Bagous nodulosus Gyllenhal, 1836
- Bagous subcarinatus Gyllenhal, 1836
- Bagous tempestivus (Herbst, 1795)
- Bagous glabrirostris (Herbst, 1795)
- Bagous lutosus (Gyllenhal, 1813)
- Bagous lutulentus (Gyllenhal, 1813)
- Bagous puncticollis Boheman, 1854
- Bagous robustus H. Brisout, 1863
- Bagous tubulus Caldara & O'Brien, 1994
- Bagous petro (Herbst, 1795)
- Bagous alismatis (Marsham, 1802)
- Aulacobaris lepidii (Germar, 1824)
- Aulacobaris picicornis (Marsham, 1802)
- Baris analis (Olivier, 1790)
- Cosmobaris scolopacea (Germar, 1818)
- Melanobaris laticollis (Marsham, 1802)
- Limnobaris dolorosa (Goeze, 1777)
- Limnobaris t-album (Linnaeus, 1758)
- Amalorrhynchus melanarius (Stephens, 1831)
- Calosirus terminatus (Herbst, 1795)
- Ceutorhynchus alliariae H. Brisout, 1860
- Ceutorhynchus assimilis (Paykull, 1792)
- Ceutorhynchus atomus Boheman, 1845
- Ceutorhynchus cakilis (Hansen, 1917)
- Ceutorhynchus chalybaeus Germar, 1824
- Ceutorhynchus cochleariae (Gyllenhal, 1813)
- Ceutorhynchus constrictus (Marsham, 1802)
- Ceutorhynchus contractus (Marsham, 1802)
- Ceutorhynchus erysimi (Fabricius, 1787)
- Ceutorhynchus hepaticus Gyllenhal, 1837
- Ceutorhynchus hirtulus Germar, 1824
- Ceutorhynchus insularis Dieckmann, 1971
- Ceutorhynchus obstrictus (Marsham, 1802)
- Ceutorhynchus pallidactylus (Marsham, 1802)
- Ceutorhynchus parvulus Brisout, Ch., 1869
- Ceutorhynchus pectoralis Weise, 1895
- Ceutorhynchus pervicax Weise, 1883
- Ceutorhynchus picitarsis Gyllenhal, 1837
- Ceutorhynchus pulvinatus Gyllenhal, 1837
- Ceutorhynchus pumilio (Gyllenhal, 1827)
- Ceutorhynchus pyrrhorhynchus (Marsham, 1802)
- Ceutorhynchus querceti (Gyllenhal, 1813)
- Ceutorhynchus rapae Gyllenhal, 1837
- Ceutorhynchus resedae (Marsham, 1802)
- Ceutorhynchus contractus pallipes(Lundy)
- Ceutorhynchus sulcicollis (Paykull, 1800)
- Ceutorhynchus syrites Germar, 1824
- Ceutorhynchus thomsoni Kolbe, 1900
- Ceutorhynchus turbatus Schultze, 1903
- Ceutorhynchus typhae (Herbst, 1795)
- Ceutorhynchus unguicularis C. G. Thomson, 1871
- Coeliodes rana (Fabricius, 1787)
- Coeliodes ruber (Marsham, 1802)
- Coeliodes transversealbofasciatus (Goeze, 1777)
- Coeliodinus nigritarsis (Hartmann, 1895)
- Coeliodinus rubicundus (Herbst, 1795)
- Datonychus angulosus (Boheman, 1845)
- Datonychus arquatus (Herbst, 1795)
- Datonychus melanostictus (Marsham, 1802)
- Datonychus urticae (Boheman, 1845)
- Drupenatus nasturtii (Germar, 1824)
- Ethelcus verrucatus (Gyllenhal, 1837)
- Glocianus distinctus (Brisout, Ch., 1870)
- Glocianus moelleri (C. G. Thomson, 1868)
- Glocianus pilosellus (Gyllenhal, 1837)
- Glocianus punctiger (Gyllenhal, 1837)
- Hadroplontus litura (Fabricius, 1775)
- Hadroplontus trimaculatus (Fabricius, 1775)
- Micrelus ericae (Gyllenhal, 1813)
- Microplontus campestris (Gyllenhal, 1837)
- Microplontus rugulosus (Herbst, 1795)
- Microplontus triangulum (Boheman, 1845)
- Mogulones asperifoliarum (Gyllenhal, 1813)
- Mogulones euphorbiae (Brisout, Ch., 1866)
- Mogulones geographicus (Goeze, 1777)
- Nedyus quadrimaculatus (Linnaeus, 1758)
- Parethelcus pollinarius (Forster, 1771)
- Poophagus sisymbrii (Fabricius, 1777)
- Sirocalodes depressicollis (Gyllenhal, 1813)
- Sirocalodes mixtus (Mulsant & Rey, 1858)
- Sirocalodes quercicola (Paykull, 1792)
- Stenocarus ruficornis (Stephens, 1831)
- Tapeinotus sellatus (Fabricius, 1794)
- Thamiocolus viduatus (Gyllenhal, 1813)
- Trichosirocalus barnevillei (Grenier, 1866)
- Trichosirocalus dawsoni (Brisout, Ch., 1869)
- Trichosirocalus horridus (Panzer, 1801)
- Trichosirocalus rufulus (Dufour, 1851)
- Trichosirocalus thalhammeri (Schultze, 1906)
- Trichosirocalus troglodytes (Fabricius, 1787)
- Zacladus exiguus (Olivier, 1807)
- Zacladus geranii (Paykull, 1800)
- Amalus scortillum (Herbst, 1795)
- Mononychus punctumalbum (Herbst, 1784)
- Eubrychius velutus (Beck, 1817)
- Neophytobius muricatus (Brisout, Ch., 1867)
- Neophytobius quadrinodosus (Gyllenhal, 1813)
- Pelenomus canaliculatus (Fåhraeus, 1843)
- Pelenomus comari (Herbst, 1795)
- Pelenomus olssoni (Israelson, 1972)
- Pelenomus quadricorniger (Colonnelli, 1986)
- Pelenomus quadrituberculatus (Fabricius, 1787)
- Pelenomus waltoni (Boheman, 1843)
- Pelenomus zumpti (Wagner, 1939)
- Phytobius leucogaster (Marsham, 1802)
- Rhinoncus albicinctus Gyllenhal, 1837
- Rhinoncus bruchoides (Herbst, 1784)
- Rhinoncus castor (Fabricius, 1793)
- Rhinoncus inconspectus (Herbst, 1795)
- Rhinoncus pericarpius (Linnaeus, 1758)
- Rhinoncus perpendicularis (Reich, 1797)
- Rutidosoma globulus (Herbst, 1795)
- Cossonus linearis (Fabricius, 1775)
- Cossonus parallelepipedus (Herbst, 1795)
- Rhopalomesites tardyi (Curtis, 1825)
- Pselactus spadix (Herbst, 1795)
- Pseudophloeophagus aeneopiceus (Boheman, 1845)
- Stereocorynes truncorum (Germar, 1824)
- Euophryum confine (Broun, 1881)
- Euophryum rufum (Broun, 1880)
- Pentarthrum huttoni Wollaston, 1854
- Macrorhyncolus littoralis (Broun, 1880)
- Rhyncolus ater (Linnaeus, 1758)
- Phloeophagus lignarius (Marsham, 1802)
- Cryptorhynchus lapathi (Linnaeus, 1758)
- Acalles misellus Boheman, 1844 ?
- Acalles ptinoides (Marsham, 1802)
- Kyklioacalles roboris (Curtis, 1835)
- Gronops inaequalis Boheman, 1842
- Gronops lunatus (Fabricius, 1775)
- Graptus triguttatus (Fabricius, 1775)
- Brachyderes incanus (Linnaeus, 1758)
- Brachyderes lusitanicus (Fabricius, 1781)
- Neliocarus faber (Herbst, 1784)
- Neliocarus nebulosus (Stephens, 1831)
- Neliocarus sus (Stephens, 1831)
- Strophosoma capitatum (De Geer, 1775)
- Strophosoma fulvicorne (Walton, 1846)
- Strophosoma melanogrammum (Forster, 1771)
- Attactagenus plumbeus (Marsham, 1802)
- Philopedon plagiatum (Schaller, 1783)
- Barynotus moerens (Fabricius, 1793)
- Barynotus obscurus (Fabricius, 1775)
- Barynotus squamosus Germar, 1824
- Omiamima mollina (Boheman, 1834)
- Otiorhynchus arcticus (O. Fabricius, 1780)
- Otiorhynchus armadillo (Rossi, 1792)
- Otiorhynchus atroapterus (De Geer, 1775)
- Otiorhynchus aurifer Boheman, 1843
- Otiorhynchus auropunctatus Gyllenhal, 1834
- Otiorhynchus clavipes (Bonsdorff, 1785)
- Otiorhynchus crataegi Germar, 1824
- Otiorhynchus desertus Rosenhauer, 1847
- Otiorhynchus ligneus (Olivier, 1807)
- Otiorhynchus ligustici (Linnaeus, 1758)
- Otiorhynchus morio (Fabricius, 1781)
- Otiorhynchus nodosus (O. F. Müller, 1764)
- Otiorhynchus ovatus (Linnaeus, 1758)
- Otiorhynchus porcatus (Herbst, 1795)
- Otiorhynchus raucus (Fabricius, 1777)
- Otiorhynchus rugifrons (Gyllenhal, 1813)
- Otiorhynchus rugosostriatus (Goeze, 1777)
- Otiorhynchus salicicola Heyden, 1908
- Otiorhynchus scaber (Linnaeus, 1758)
- Otiorhynchus setosulus Stierlin, 1861
- Otiorhynchus singularis (Linnaeus, 1767)
- Otiorhynchus sulcatus (Fabricius, 1775)
- Otiorhynchus uncinatus Germar, 1824
- Caenopsis fissirostris (Walton, 1847)
- Caenopsis waltoni (Boheman, 1843)
- Peritelus sphaeroides Germar, 1824
- Phyllobius pyri (Linnaeus, 1758)
- Phyllobius vespertinus (Fabricius, 1793)
- Phyllobius argentatus (Linnaeus, 1758)
- Phyllobius glaucus (Scopoli, 1763)
- Phyllobius pomaceus Gyllenhal, 1834
- Phyllobius oblongus (Linnaeus, 1758)
- Phyllobius roboretanus Gredler, 1882
- Phyllobius viridicollis (Fabricius, 1801)
- Phyllobius maculicornis Germar, 1824
- Phyllobius virideaeris (Laicharting, 1781)
- Liophloeus tessulatus (O. F. Müller, 1776)
- Pachyrhinus lethierryi (Desbrochers, 1875)
- Pachyrhinus mustela (Herbst, 1797)
- Polydrusus tereticollis (De Geer, 1775)
- Polydrusus formosus (Mayer, 1779)
- Polydrusus mollis (Ström, 1768)
- Polydrusus confluens Stephens, 1831
- Polydrusus flavipes (De Geer, 1775)
- Polydrusus pterygomalis Boheman, 1840
- Polydrusus marginatus Stephens, 1831
- Polydrusus cervinus (Linnaeus, 1758)
- Polydrusus pilosus Gredler, 1866
- Polydrusus pulchellus Stephens, 1831
- Barypeithes sulcifrons (Boheman, 1843)
- Barypeithes araneiformis (Schrank, 1781)
- Barypeithes curvimanus (Jacquelin du Val, 1855)
- Barypeithes pellucidus (Boheman, 1834)
- Barypeithes pyrenaeus Seidlitz, 1868
- Brachysomus echinatus (Bonsdorff, 1785)
- Brachysomus hirtus (Boheman, 1845)
- Sciaphilus asperatus (Bonsdorff, 1785)
- Andrion regensteinense (Herbst, 1797)
- Charagmus griseus (Fabricius, 1775)
- Coelositona cambricus (Stephens, 1831)
- Coelositona cinerascens (Fåhraeus, 1840)
- Coelositona puberulus (Reitter, 1903)
- Sitona ambiguus Gyllenhal, 1834
- Sitona cylindricollis (Fåhraeus, 1840)
- Sitona gemellatus Gyllenhal, 1834
- Sitona hispidulus (Fabricius, 1777)
- Sitona humeralis Stephens, 1831
- Sitona lepidus Gyllenhal, 1834
- Sitona lineatus (Linnaeus, 1758)
- Sitona lineellus (Bonsdorff, 1785)
- Sitona macularius (Marsham, 1802)
- Sitona ononidis Sharp, 1866
- Sitona puncticollis Stephens, 1831
- Sitona striatellus Gyllenhal, 1834
- Sitona sulcifrons (Thunberg, 1798)
- Sitona suturalis Stephens, 1831
- Sitona waterhousei Walton, 1846
- Tanymecus palliatus (Fabricius, 1787)
- Cathormiocerus attaphilus Brisout, Ch., 1880
- Cathormiocerus maritimus Rye, 1874
- Cathormiocerus myrmecophilus (Seidlitz, 1868)
- Cathormiocerus socius Boheman, 1843
- Romualdius scaber (Linnaeus, 1758)
- Trachyphloeus alternans Gyllenhal, 1834
- Trachyphloeus angustisetulus Hansen, 1915
- Trachyphloeus aristatus (Gyllenhal, 1827)
- Trachyphloeus asperatus Boheman, 1843
- Trachyphloeus digitalis (Gyllenhal, 1827)
- Trachyphloeus rectus C. G. Thomson, 1865
- Trachyphloeus scabriculus (Linnaeus, 1771)
- Trachyphloeus spinimanus Germar, 1824
- Tropiphorus elevatus (Herbst, 1795)
- Tropiphorus obtusus (Bonsdorff, 1785)
- Tropiphorus terricola (Newman, 1838)
- Hypera arator (Linnaeus, 1758)
- Hypera fuscocinerea (Marsham, 1802)
- Hypera nigrirostris (Fabricius, 1775)
- Hypera ononidis Chevrolat, 1863
- Hypera plantaginis (De Geer, 1775)
- Hypera postica (Gyllenhal, 1813)
- Hypera suspiciosa (Herbst, 1795)
- Hypera venusta (Fabricius, 1781)
- Hypera dauci (Olivier, 1807)
- Hypera zoilus (Scopoli, 1763)
- Hypera diversipunctata (Schrank, 1798)
- Hypera meles (Fabricius, 1793)
- Hypera arundinis (Paykull, 1792)
- Hypera pollux (Fabricius, 1801)
- Hypera rumicis (Linnaeus, 1758)
- Hypera pastinaceae (Rossi, 1790)
- Limobius borealis (Paykull, 1792)
- Limobius mixtus (Boheman, 1834)
- Larinus planus (Fabricius, 1793)
- Lixus paraplecticus (Linnaeus, 1758)
- Lixus angustatus (Fabricius, 1775)
- Lixus vilis (Rossi, 1790)
- Lixus iridis Olivier, 1807
- Lixus scabricollis Boheman, 1843
- Bothynoderes affinis (Schrank, 1781)
- Cleonis pigra (Scopoli, 1763)
- Coniocleonus hollbergii (Fåhraeus, 1842)
- Coniocleonus nebulosus (Linnaeus, 1758)
- Rhinocyllus conicus (Frölich, 1792)
- Magdalis duplicata Germar, 1818
- Magdalis memnonia (Gyllenhal in Faldermann, 1837)
- Magdalis phlegmatica (Herbst, 1797)
- Magdalis ruficornis (Linnaeus, 1758)
- Magdalis armigera (Fourcroy, 1785)
- Magdalis carbonaria (Linnaeus, 1758)
- Magdalis barbicornis (Latreille, 1804)
- Magdalis cerasi (Linnaeus, 1758)
- Liparus coronatus (Goeze, 1777)
- Liparus germanus (Linnaeus, 1758)
- Leiosoma deflexum (Panzer, 1795)
- Leiosoma oblongulum Boheman, 1842
- Leiosoma troglodytes (Rye, 1873)
- Mitoplinthus caliginosus (Fabricius, 1775)
- Anchonidium unguiculare (Aubé, 1850)
- Anoplus plantaris (Naezen, 1794)
- Anoplus roboris Suffrian, 1840
- Hylobius abietis (Linnaeus, 1758)
- Hylobius transversovittatus (Goeze, 1777)
- Lepyrus capucinus (Schaller, 1783)
- Syagrius intrudens C. O. Waterhouse, 1903
- Pissodes castaneus (De Geer, 1775)
- Pissodes pini (Linnaeus, 1758)
- Pissodes validirostris (C. R. Sahlberg, 1834)
- Trachodes hispidus (Linnaeus, 1758)
- Orobitis cyaneus (Linnaeus, 1758)
- Scolytus intricatus (Ratzeburg, 1837)
- Scolytus laevis Chapuis, 1873
- Scolytus mali (Bechstein & Scharfenberg, 1805)
- Scolytus multistriatus (Marsham, 1802)
- Scolytus pygmaeus (Fabricius, 1787)
- Scolytus ratzeburgi Janson, 1856
- Scolytus rugulosus (P. W. J. Müller, 1818)
- Scolytus scolytus (Fabricius, 1775)
- Pityophthorus lichtensteinii (Ratzeburg, 1837)
- Pityophthorus pubescens (Marsham, 1802)
- Cryphalus asperatus (Gyllenhal, 1813)
- Ernoporicus caucasicus (Lindemann, 1876)
- Ernoporicus fagi (Fabricius, 1798)
- Ernoporus tiliae (Panzer, 1793)
- Trypophloeus binodulus (Ratzeburg, 1837)
- Crypturgus subcribrosus Eggers, 1933
- Dryocoetes alni (Georg, 1856)
- Dryocoetes autographus (Ratzeburg, 1837)
- Dryocoetes villosus (Fabricius, 1793)
- Lymantor coryli (Perris, 1855)
- Taphrorychus bicolor (Herbst, 1793)
- Taphrorychus villifrons (Dufour, 1843)
- Xylocleptes bispinus (Duftschmid, 1825)
- Ips acuminatus (Gyllenhal, 1827)
- Ips cembrae (Heer, 1836)
- Ips sexdentatus (Boerner, 1767)
- Ips typographus (Linnaeus, 1758)
- Orthotomicus erosus (Wollaston, 1857)
- Orthotomicus laricis (Fabricius, 1793)
- Orthotomicus suturalis (Gyllenhal, 1827)
- Pityogenes bidentatus (Herbst, 1783)
- Pityogenes chalcographus (Linnaeus, 1761)
- Pityogenes quadridens (Hartig, 1834)
- Pityogenes trepanatus (Nördlinger, 1848)
- Xyleborinus saxesenii (Ratzeburg, 1837)
- Xyleborus dispar (Fabricius, 1793)
- Xyleborus dryographus (Ratzeburg, 1837)
- Xyleborus monographus (Fabricius, 1793)
- Trypodendron domesticum (Linnaeus, 1758)
- Trypodendron lineatum (Olivier, 1795)
- Trypodendron signatum (Fabricius, 1793)
- Hylesinus crenatus (Fabricius, 1787)
- Hylesinus orni Fuchs, 1906
- Hylesinus toranio (Danthoine in Bernard, 1788)
- Hylesinus varius (Fabricius, 1775)
- Hylastinus obscurus (Marsham, 1802)
- Kissophagus hederae (Schmitt, 1843)
- Pteleobius vittatus (Fabricius, 1787)
- Hylastes angustatus (Herbst, 1793)
- Hylastes ater (Paykull, 1800)
- Hylastes attenuatus Erichson, 1836
- Hylastes brunneus Erichson, 1836
- Hylastes cunicularius Erichson, 1836
- Hylastes opacus Erichson, 1836
- Hylurgops palliatus (Gyllenhal, 1813)
- Phloeosinus bicolor (Brullé, 1832)
- Phloeosinus thujae (Perris, 1855)
- Phloeotribus rhododactylus (Marsham, 1802)
- Polygraphus poligraphus (Linnaeus, 1758)
- Dendroctonus micans (Kugelann, 1794)
- Tomicus minor (Hartig, 1834)
- Tomicus piniperda (Linnaeus, 1758)
- Xylechinus pilosus (Ratzeburg, 1837)
- Tanysphyrus lemnae (Paykull, 1792)

Family Platypodidae Shuckard, 1840

- Platypus cylindrus (Fabricius, 1793)
