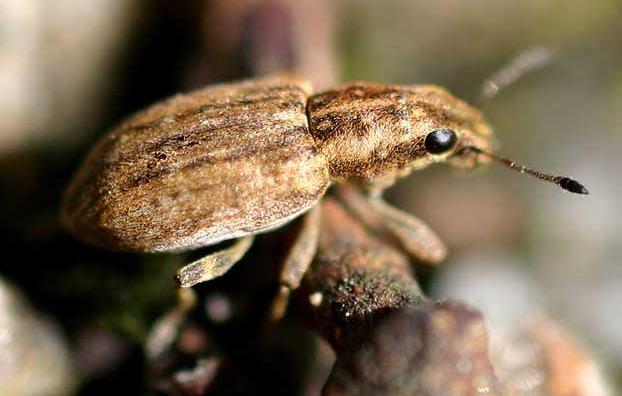
- Sitona lineatus

Scientific classification
- Kingdom: Animalia
- Phylum: Arthropoda
- Clade: Pancrustacea
- Class: Insecta
- Order: Coleoptera
- Suborder: Polyphaga
- Infraorder: Cucujiformia
- Superfamily: Curculionoidea
- Family: Curculionidae
- Subfamily: Entiminae
- Tribe: Sitonini; Gistel, 1848

Genera
- 7 extant and 1 fossil genera

= Sitonini =

Sitonini Temporal range: Lutetian–recent

Tribe of beetles

Sitonini is a tribe of weevils in the Entiminae subfamily. They feed on Fabaceae. The tribe has holarctic native distribution. It includes important pests in the genus Sitona.

== Genera ==
There are seven extant genera:

- Andrion Velázquez de Castro, 2007
- Charagmus Schönherr, 1826
- Coelositona González, 1971
- Eugnathus Schoenherr, 1834
- Schelopius Desbrochers des Loges, 1872
- Sitona Germar, 1817
- Velazquezia Alonso-Zarazaga & Lyal, 1999

There is also one fossil genus, †Sitonitellus.
