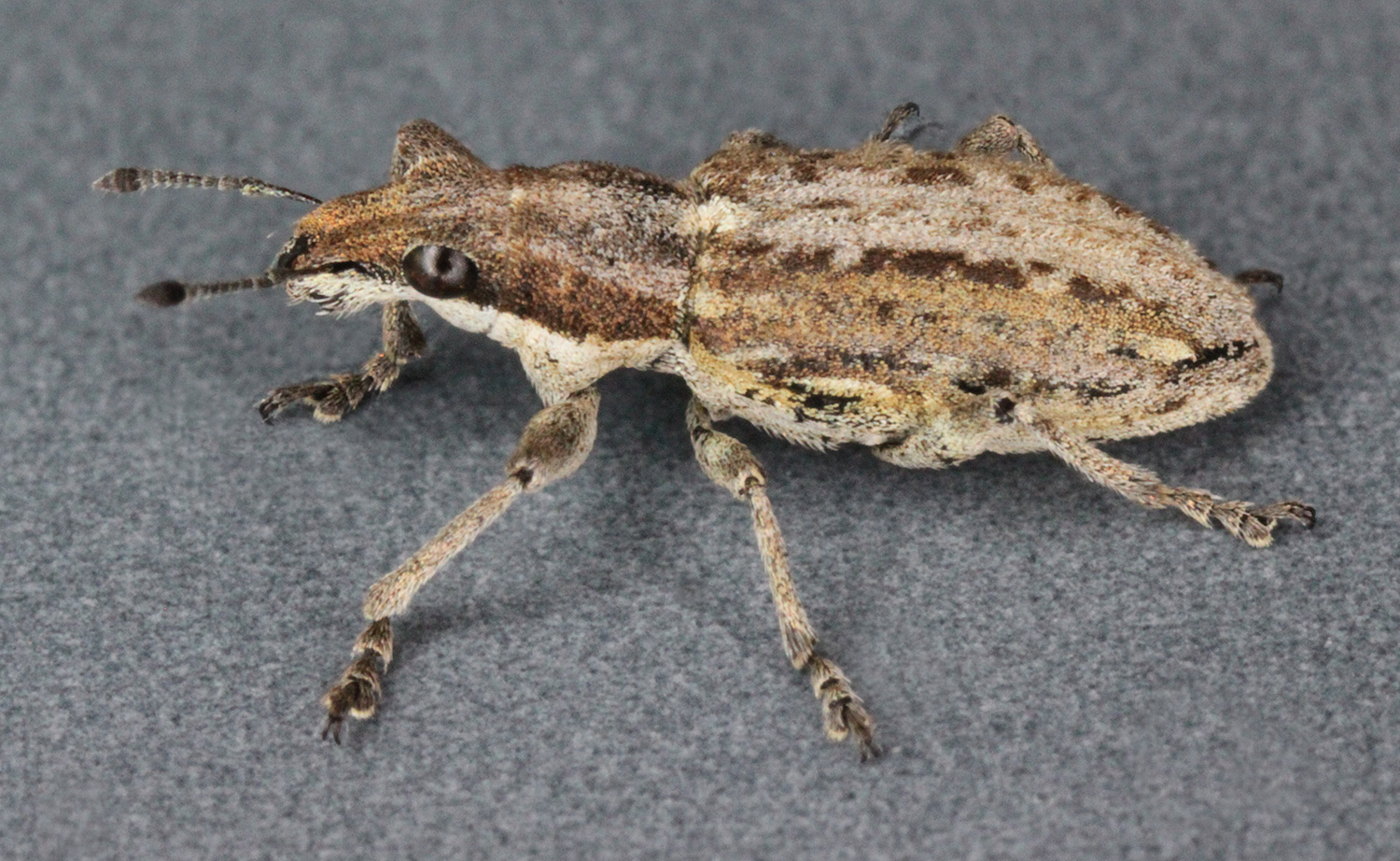
- Sitona griseus Dyffryn, North Wales

Scientific classification
- Kingdom: Animalia
- Phylum: Arthropoda
- Class: Insecta
- Order: Coleoptera
- Suborder: Polyphaga
- Infraorder: Cucujiformia
- Family: Curculionidae
- Genus: Sitona
- Species: S. griseus

Binomial name
- Sitona griseus (Fabricius, 1775)

= Sitona griseus =

Species of beetle

Sitona griseus is a species of weevil native to Europe.
