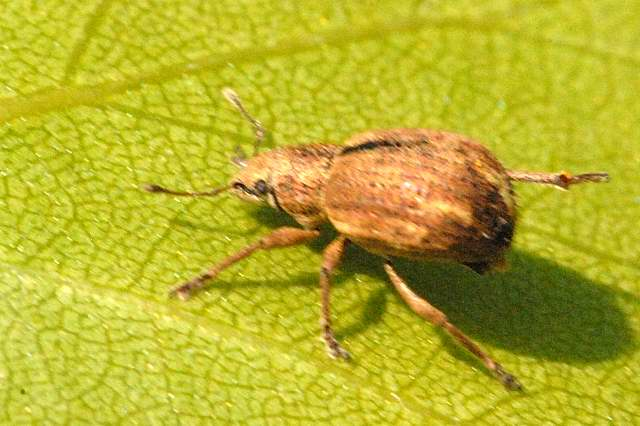
- Strophosoma melanogrammum

Scientific classification
- Kingdom: Animalia
- Phylum: Arthropoda
- Class: Insecta
- Order: Coleoptera
- Suborder: Polyphaga
- Infraorder: Cucujiformia
- Family: Curculionidae
- Genus: Strophosoma; Billberg, 1820

= Strophosoma =

Genus of beetles

Strophosoma is a genus of beetles belonging to the family Curculionidae.

The species of this genus are found in Europe and North America.

Species:

- Strophosoma albosignatum (Boheman, 1840)
- Strophosoma alonsoi Pelletier, 1994
- Strophosoma capitatum (DeGeer, 1775)
- Strophosoma melanogrammum (Forster, 1771)
