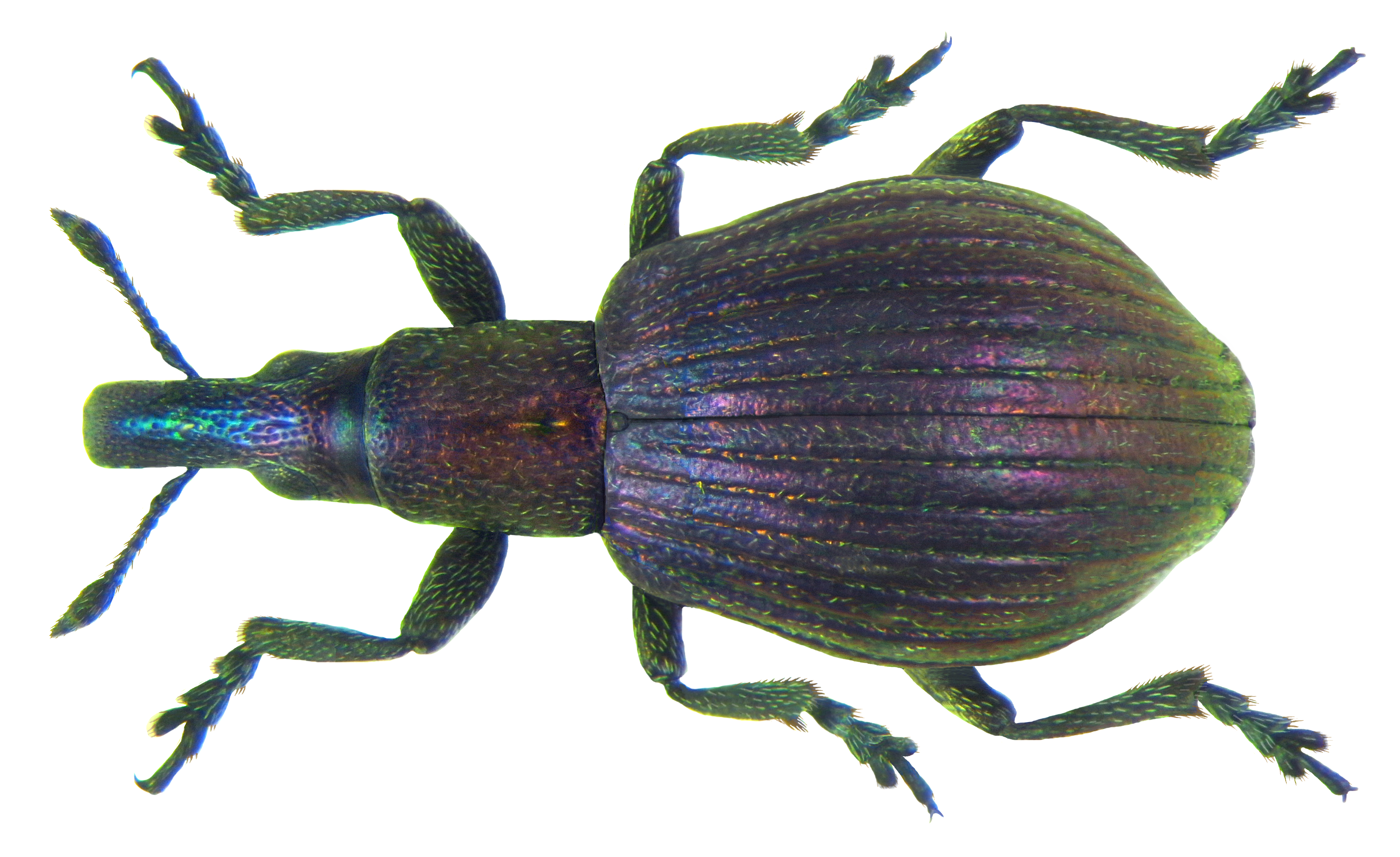

Scientific classification
- Kingdom: Animalia
- Phylum: Arthropoda
- Class: Insecta
- Order: Coleoptera
- Family: Brentidae
- Genus: Pseudaplemonus
- Species: P. limonii

Binomial name
- Pseudaplemonus limonii

Synonyms
- Apion limonii Kirby (1808)

= Pseudaplemonus limonii =

Species of beetle

Pseudaplemonus limonii is a species of weevil from the subfamily Apioninae. It lives on common sea-lavender (Limonium vulgare) on the coasts of western Europe and northwest Africa.

== Description ==
This beetle is 2.8 millimetres (0.11 in) to 4 millimetres (0.16 in) long. Its colour is a metallic purple or copper tone which sometimes includes shades of violet or blue. The body is sparsely covered with tiny white hair. The snout is straight and squat, and is almost identical in both sexes. The short antennae have compact club-like ends. The prothorax is oblong with a small cavity. The forewings on both sides are bulgy with their greatest width in the centre section. They are thinly striped with wide spaces in between.

== Life ==
Pseudaplemonus limonii lives predominantly, if not exclusively, on common sea-lavender, but it is suggested that it also accepts other species of Limonium and possibly also Frankenia in southern Spain or Portugal. To reproduce, the weevil will chew a slot into the plant's root crown wherein it lays its eggs. The hole is then sealed by the bug with a secretion. The larvae feed from the root crown and the lower part of the stalk. Adult specimens have been observed from June to mid-October.

== Distribution ==
Like its host plant, this weevil lives on the sea shores of the western Mediterranean and Atlantic Ocean from Algeria and Morocco across Spain, France, Britain and Belgium to Germany. In Germany it is found on the salt marshes of the North Frisian Islands but is absent in the Baltic Sea coasts and in Denmark. The species is heavily threatened in Germany and rated "Nationally Scarce" in the United Kingdom.

== See also ==
- List of weevil (Curculionoidea) species recorded in Britain
