= Sitona californius =

Scientific classification
- Domain: Eukaryota
- Kingdom: Animalia
- Phylum: Arthropoda
- Class: Insecta
- Order: Coleoptera
- Suborder: Polyphaga
- Infraorder: Cucujiformia
- Family: Curculionidae
- Genus: Sitona
- Species: S. californius

Binomial name
- Sitona californius (Fahraeus, 1840)

Synonyms
- Sitona californicus Mannerheim, 1843; Sitones angustulus Casey, 1888; Sitones apacheanus Casey, 1888; Sitones explicitus Casey, 1888; Sitones extrusus Casey, 1888; Sitones hispidiceps Casey, 1888; Sitones prominens Casey, 1888; Sitona cockerelli Blaisdell, 1938; Sitona oregonensis Tanner, 1987

Species of beetle

Sitona californius is a species of broad-nosed weevil in the beetle family Curculionidae. The species has often been misspelled as "Sitona californicus".

Sitona californius is found in the United States.
