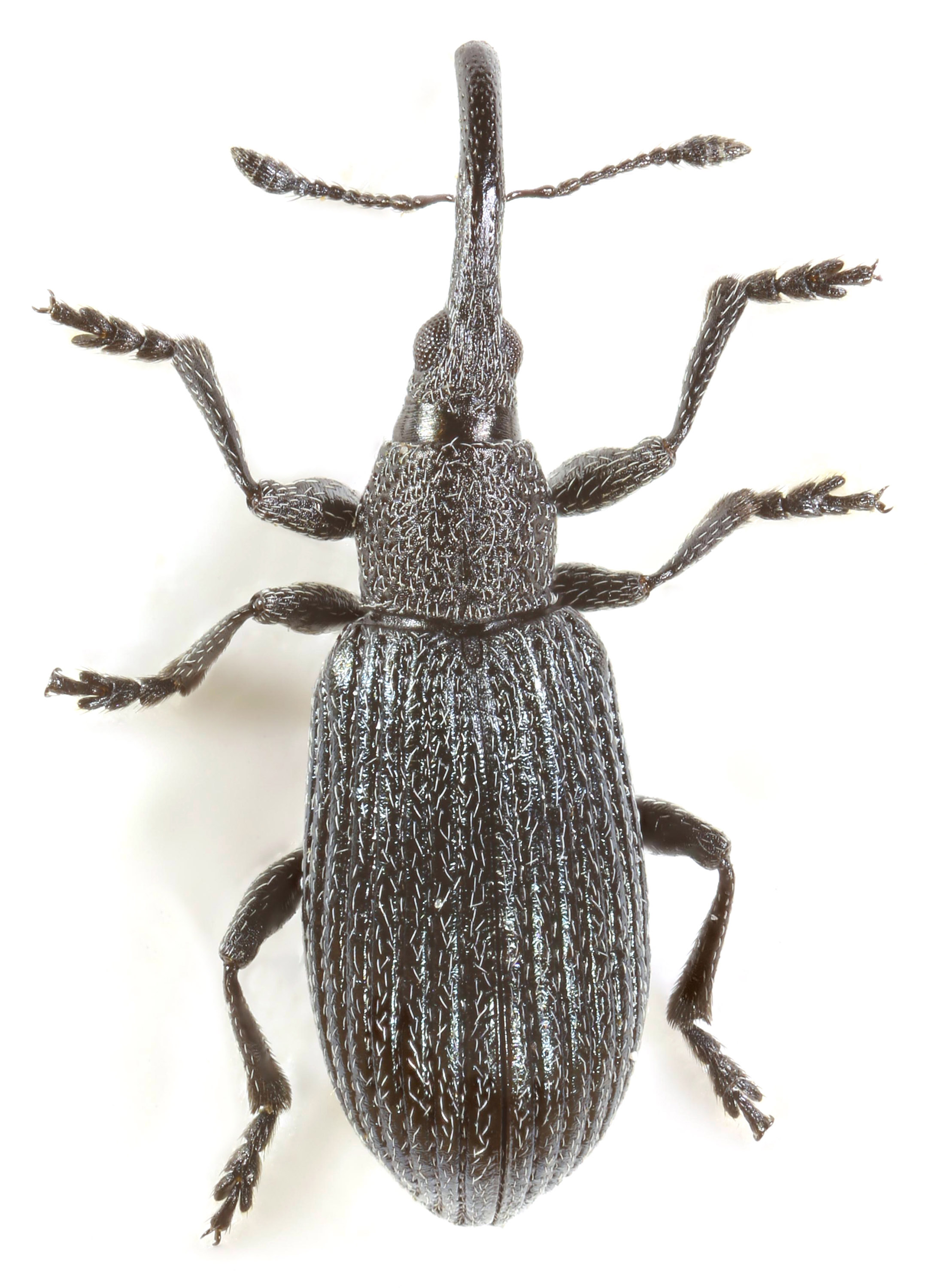
- Stenopterapion meliloti

Scientific classification
- Domain: Eukaryota
- Kingdom: Animalia
- Phylum: Arthropoda
- Class: Insecta
- Order: Coleoptera
- Suborder: Polyphaga
- Infraorder: Cucujiformia
- Family: Brentidae
- Subtribe: Synapiina
- Genus: Stenopterapion; Bokor, 1923

= Stenopterapion =

Genus of beetles

Stenopterapion is a genus of pear-shaped weevils in the family of beetles known as Brentidae. There are about six described species in Stenopterapion.

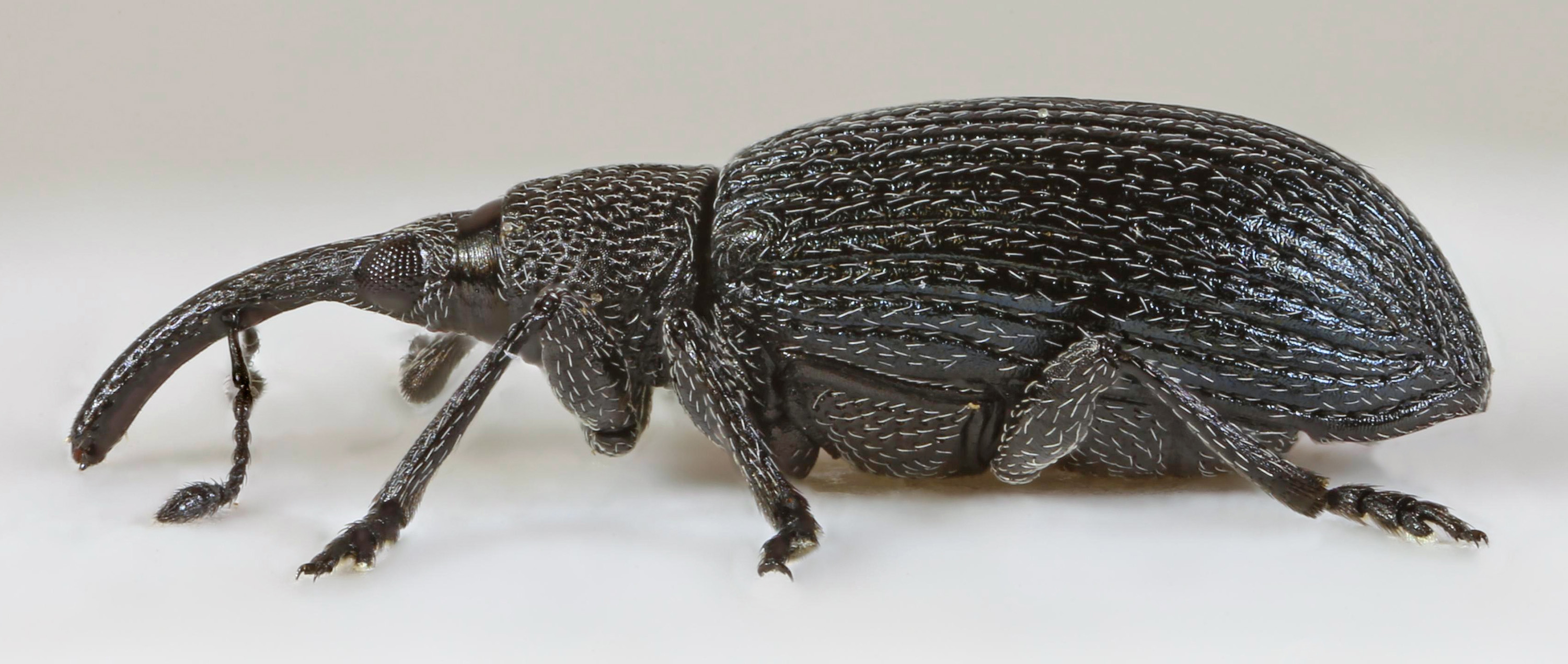
Stenopterapion meliloti

== Species ==
These six species belong to the genus Stenopterapion:

- Stenopterapion cantabricum (Desbrochers des Loges, 1869)^{g}
- Stenopterapion dubium (Desbrochers, 1896)^{g}
- Stenopterapion intermedium (Eppelsheim, 1875)^{g}
- Stenopterapion meliloti (Kirby, 1808)^{g b}
- Stenopterapion scutellare (Kirby, 1811)^{g}
- Stenopterapion subsquamosum (Desbrochers, 1891)^{g}

Data sources: i = ITIS, c = Catalogue of Life, g = GBIF, b = Bugguide.net
