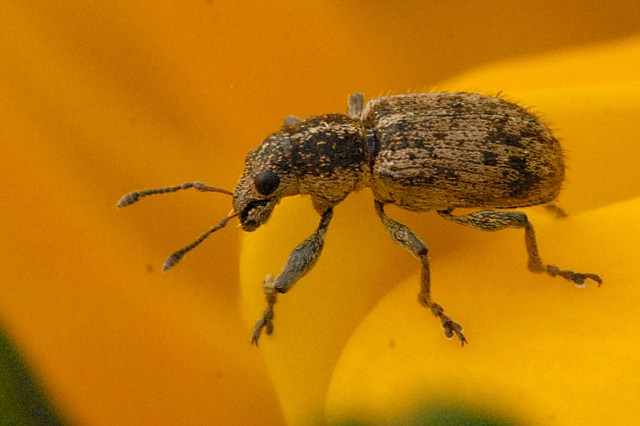
- Sitona macularius

Scientific classification
- Kingdom: Animalia
- Phylum: Arthropoda
- Class: Insecta
- Order: Coleoptera
- Suborder: Polyphaga
- Infraorder: Cucujiformia
- Family: Curculionidae
- Subfamily: Entiminae
- Tribe: Sitonini
- Genus: Sitona; Germar, 1817

Species
- 100+

= Sitona =

Genus of beetles

Sitona is a large genus of weevils in the family Curculionidae native to the Nearctic and Palaearctic regions. Over 100 species have been described. Sitona is easily distinguished from related genera by flat, recumbent scales on the mandibles, by the absence of an oval scar on the mandibles, by short and broad rostrum with a deep, longitudinal, median groove, and by dense scales on the body.

Sitona specialize on legumes, plants of the family Fabaceae. The larvae eat the root nodules and the adults eat the leaves. Several species of Sitona are important agricultural pests of legumes, especially in its native regions and introduced populations in South Africa, Australia and New Zealand.

Species include:

- Sitona aliceae
- Sitona aquilonius
- Sitona bicolor
- Sitona brucki
- Sitona californius
- Sitona concavirostris
- Sitona crinitus
- Sitona cylindricollis
- Sitona demoflysi
- Sitona desertus
- Sitona discoideus Gyllenhal
- Sitona fairmairei Allard, 1869
- Sitona flavescens
- Sitona fronto
- Sitona griseus
- Sitona hispidulus
- Sitona lepidus Gyllenhal – clover root weevil
- Sitona lineatus – pea leaf weevil
- Sitona lineellus
- Sitona macularius
- Sitona maroccanus
- Sitona planifrons
- Sitona puncticollis
- Sitona striatellus
- Sitona sulcifrons
- Sitona syriacus
- Sitona tanneri
- Sitona vittatus
- Sitona volkovitshi
- Sitona wahrmani
