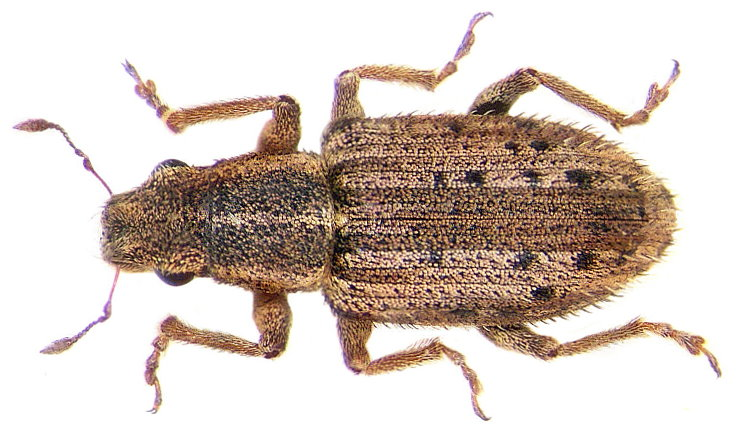

Scientific classification
- Kingdom: Animalia
- Phylum: Arthropoda
- Class: Insecta
- Order: Coleoptera
- Suborder: Polyphaga
- Infraorder: Cucujiformia
- Family: Curculionidae
- Genus: Sitona
- Species: S. macularius

Binomial name
- Sitona macularius (Marsham, 1802)

= Sitona macularius =

Species of beetle

Sitona macularius is a species of weevil native to Europe.
