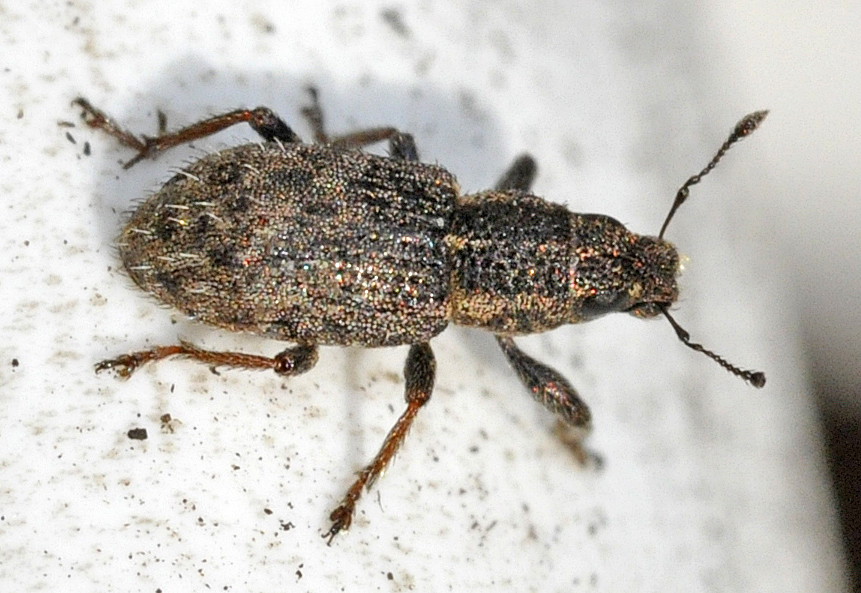

Scientific classification
- Kingdom: Animalia
- Phylum: Arthropoda
- Clade: Pancrustacea
- Class: Insecta
- Order: Coleoptera
- Suborder: Polyphaga
- Infraorder: Cucujiformia
- Superfamily: Curculionoidea
- Family: Curculionidae
- Genus: Sitona
- Species: S. hispidulus

Binomial name
- Sitona hispidulus (Fabricius, 1777)

= Sitona hispidulus =

Species of beetle

Sitona hispidulus is a species of weevil native to Europe and introduced to Asia and North America.
