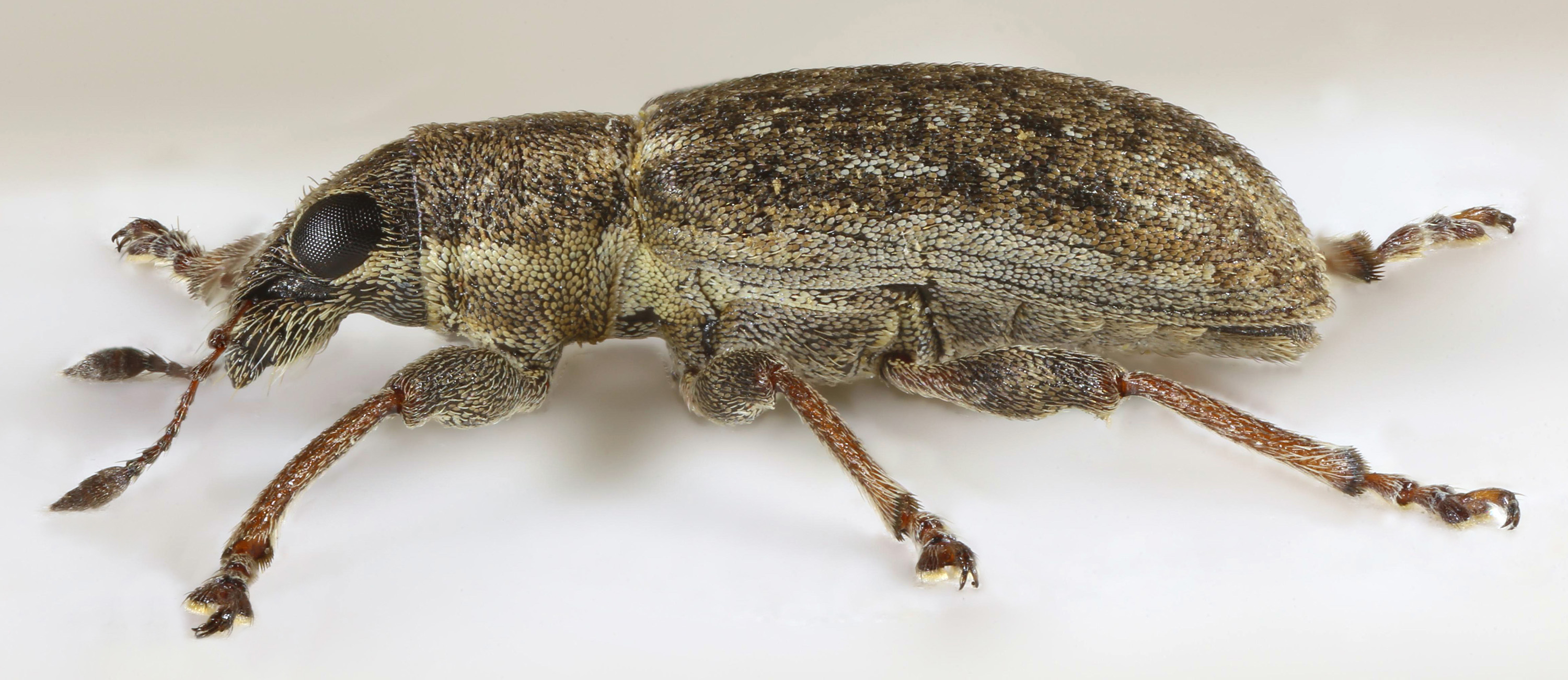

Scientific classification
- Domain: Eukaryota
- Kingdom: Animalia
- Phylum: Arthropoda
- Class: Insecta
- Order: Coleoptera
- Suborder: Polyphaga
- Infraorder: Cucujiformia
- Family: Curculionidae
- Genus: Sitona
- Species: S. cylindricollis

Binomial name
- Sitona cylindricollis (Fahraeus, 1840)

Synonyms
- Sitona alpinensis Tanner, 1987

= Sitona cylindricollis =

Species of beetle

Sitona cylindricollis, the sweetclover weevil, is a species of broad-nosed weevil in the beetle family Curculionidae. It is found in North America, where it is a pest of sweetclover and alfalfa. Larvae feed on the root nodules of these plants, eventually pupating near the soil surface.

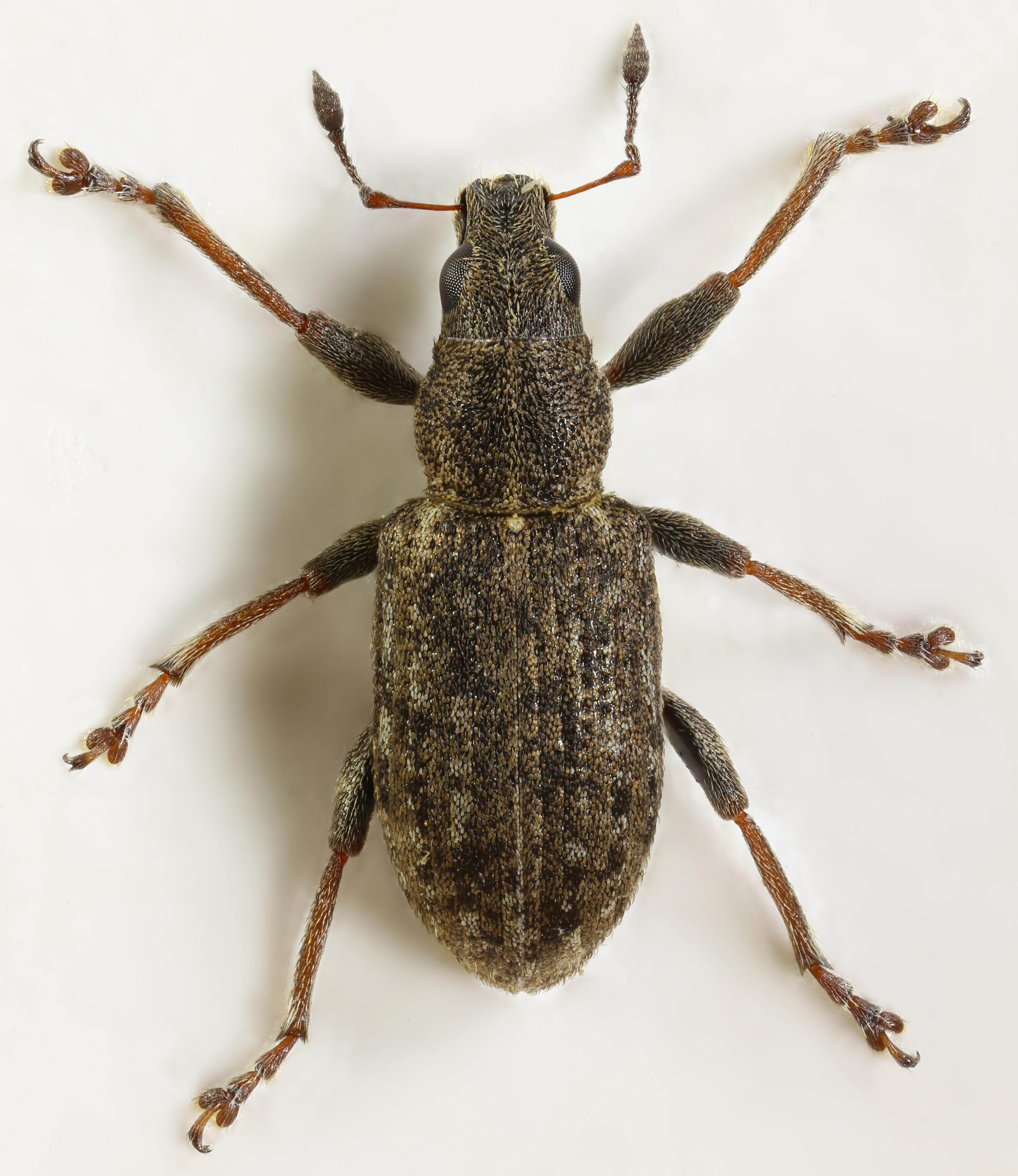
Sweetclover weevil, Sitona cylindricollis
