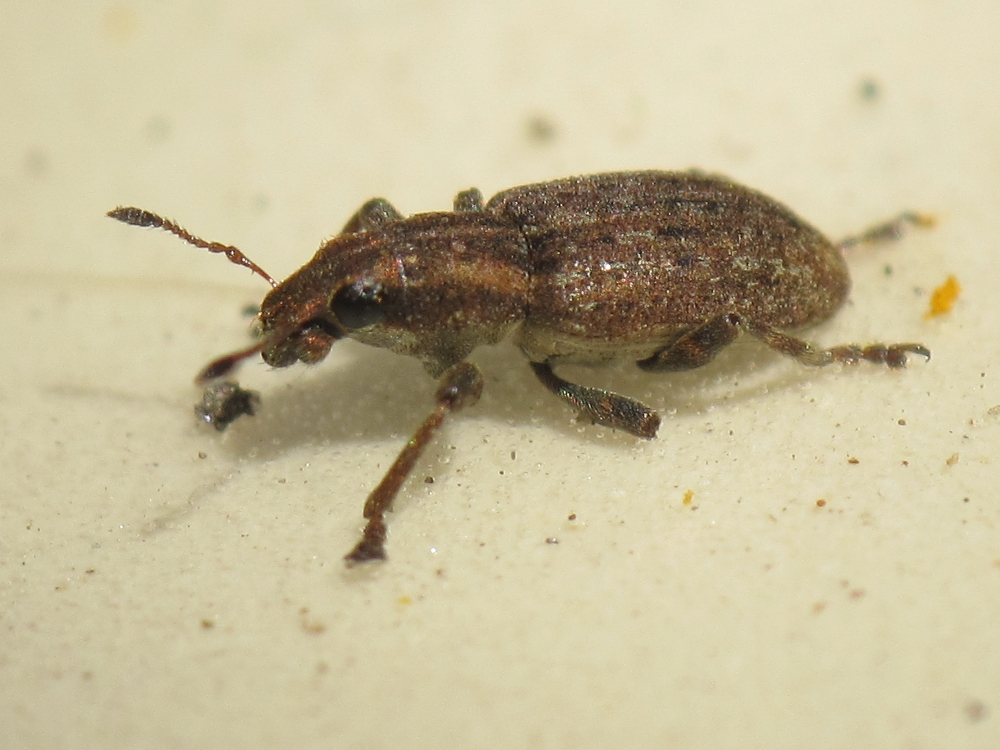

Scientific classification
- Kingdom: Animalia
- Phylum: Arthropoda
- Clade: Pancrustacea
- Class: Insecta
- Order: Coleoptera
- Suborder: Polyphaga
- Infraorder: Cucujiformia
- Superfamily: Curculionoidea
- Family: Curculionidae
- Genus: Sitona
- Species: S. lepidus

Binomial name
- Sitona lepidus Gyllenhaal, 1834

= Sitona lepidus =

Species of beetle

Sitona lepidus or clover root weevil is a species of weevil found in Europe. It has now spread to North America and New Zealand.

S. lepidus was found in New Zealand pastures in 1996 and poses a threat to farm productivity since it damages the clover plant. The use of the parasitic wasp Microctonus aethiopoides as a biological control is under way in Southland, New Zealand.
