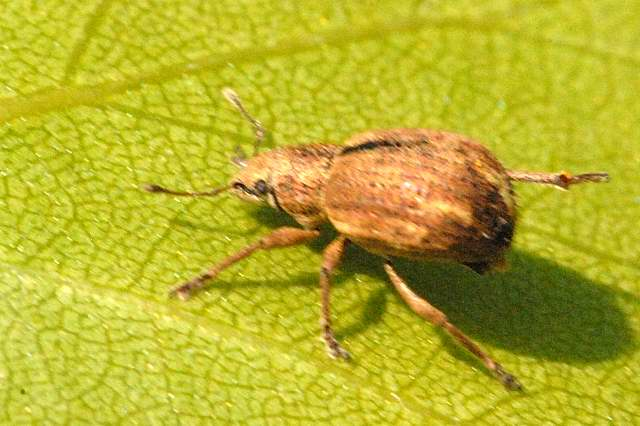

Scientific classification
- Domain: Eukaryota
- Kingdom: Animalia
- Phylum: Arthropoda
- Class: Insecta
- Order: Coleoptera
- Suborder: Polyphaga
- Infraorder: Cucujiformia
- Family: Curculionidae
- Genus: Strophosoma
- Species: S. melanogrammum

Binomial name
- Strophosoma melanogrammum (Forster, 1771)

= Strophosoma melanogrammum =

Species of beetle

Strophosoma melanogrammum is a species of weevil that is native to the European Continent, but has been introduced into North America as well.
