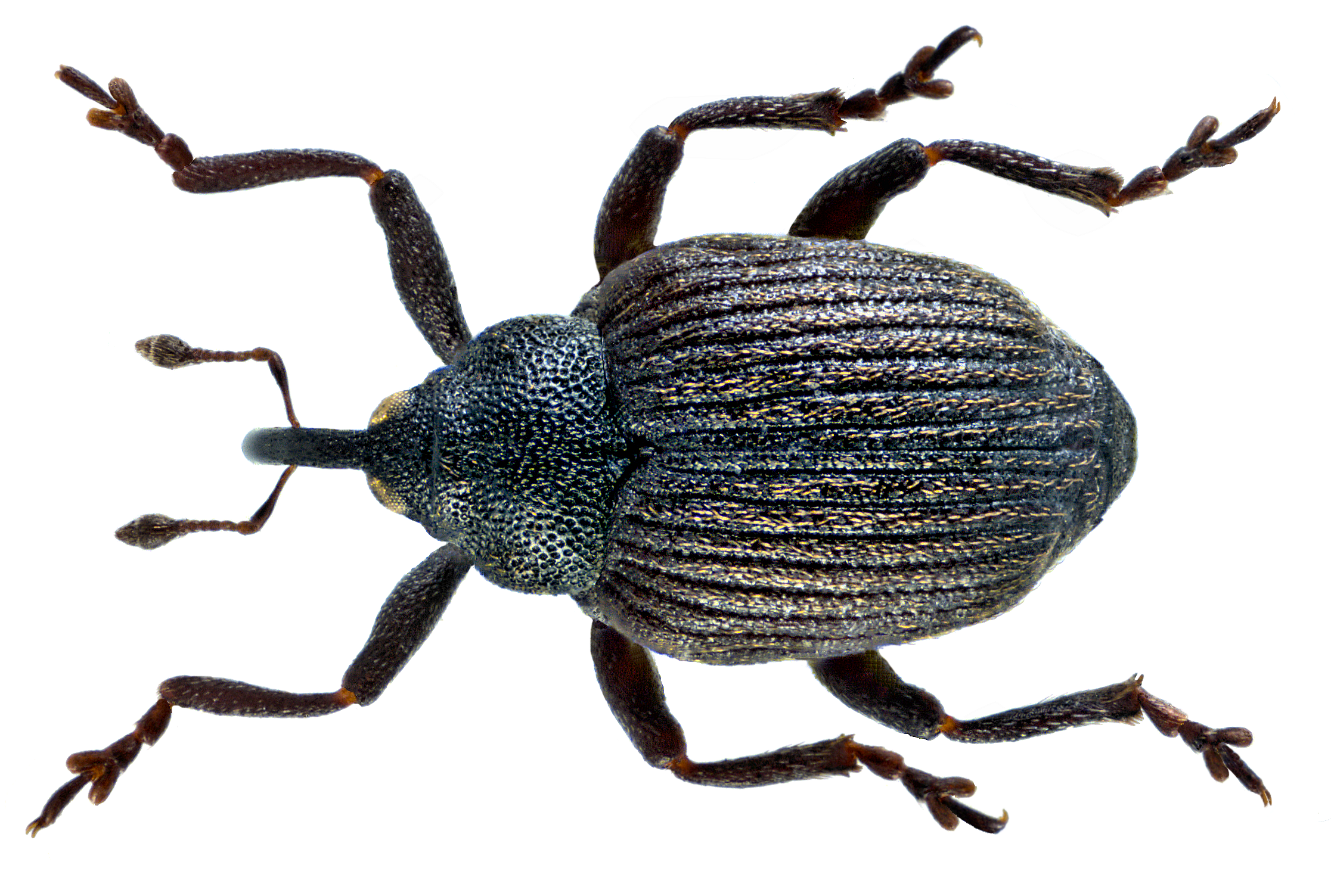

Scientific classification
- Kingdom: Animalia
- Phylum: Arthropoda
- Class: Insecta
- Order: Coleoptera
- Suborder: Polyphaga
- Infraorder: Cucujiformia
- Family: Curculionidae
- Genus: Amalorrhynchus
- Species: A. melanarius

Binomial name
- Amalorrhynchus melanarius (Stephens, 1831)

Synonyms
- List: Nedyus melanarius Stephens, 1831; Ceuthorhynchus convexicollis Gyllenhal, 1837>; Ceuthorhynchus camelinae Boheman, 1845; Ceuthorhynchus glaucus Boheman, 1845; Amalorrhynchus camelinae; Amalorrhynchus convexicollis; Amalorrhynchus glaucus

= Amalorrhynchus melanarius =

Species of beetle

Amalorrhynchus melanarius is a species of beetle in the family Curculionidae.
