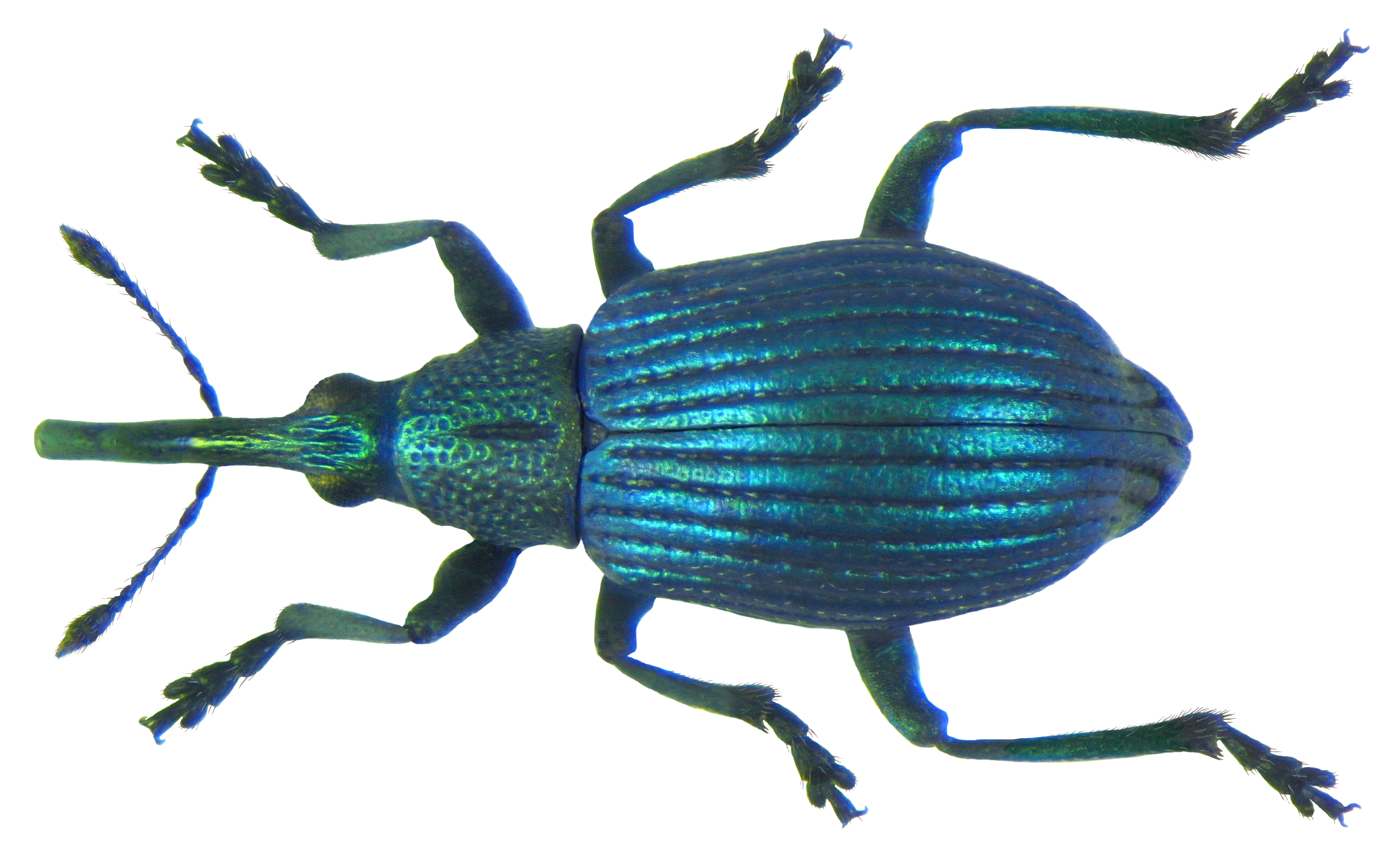

Scientific classification
- Domain: Eukaryota
- Kingdom: Animalia
- Phylum: Arthropoda
- Class: Insecta
- Order: Coleoptera
- Suborder: Polyphaga
- Infraorder: Cucujiformia
- Family: Brentidae
- Subfamily: Apioninae
- Genus: Pseudoprotapion
- Species: P. astragali

Binomial name
- Pseudoprotapion astragali (Paykull, 1800)

= Pseudoprotapion astragali =

Species of beetle

Pseudoprotapion astragali is a species of beetles belonging to the family Apionidae.

It is native to Europe.

Synonym:

- Apion astragali (Paykull, 1800)
