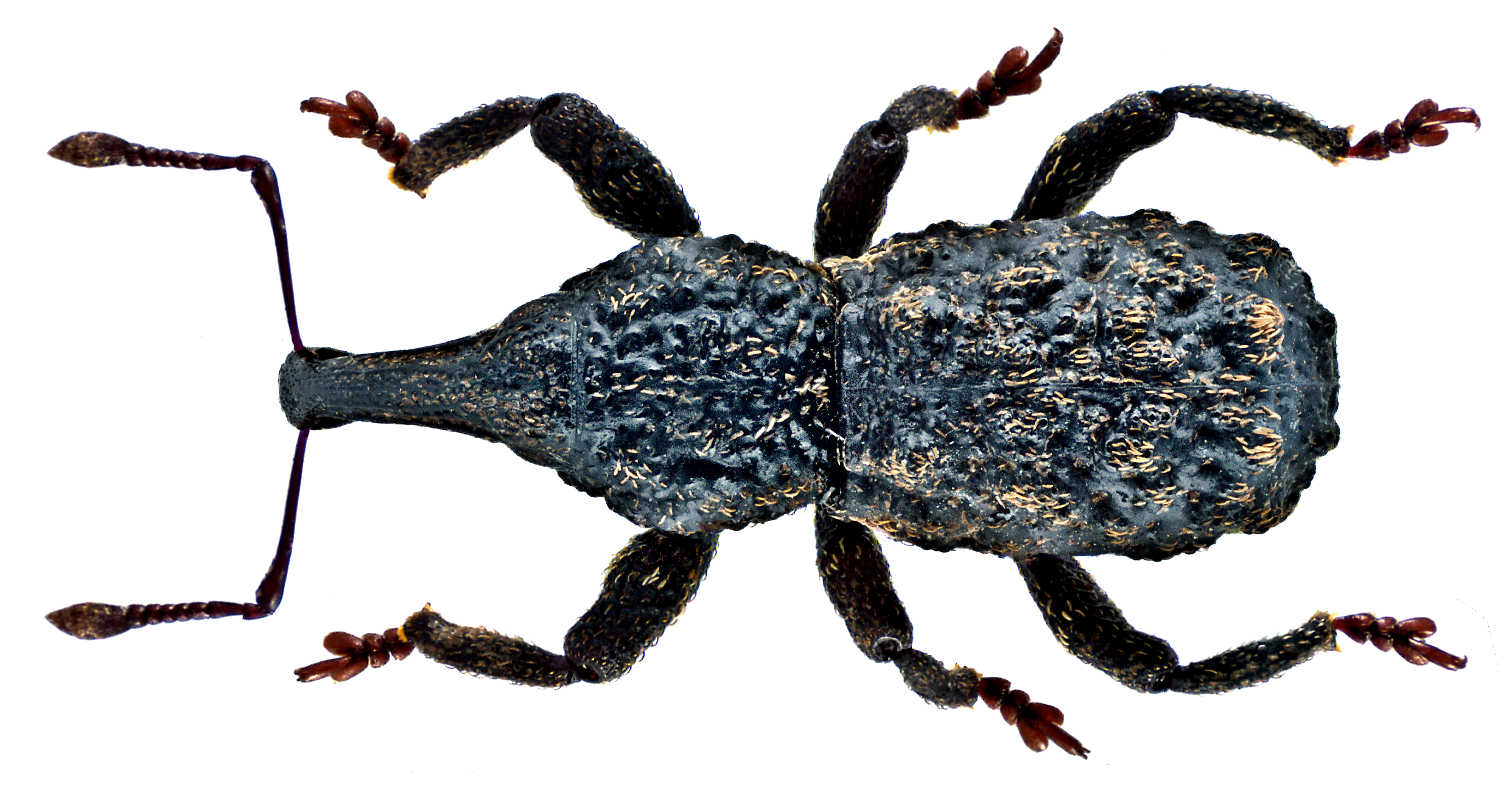
- Syagrius intrudens 5.4 mm

Scientific classification
- Kingdom: Animalia
- Phylum: Arthropoda
- Clade: Pancrustacea
- Class: Insecta
- Order: Coleoptera
- Suborder: Polyphaga
- Infraorder: Cucujiformia
- Superfamily: Curculionoidea
- Family: Curculionidae
- Genus: Syagrius
- Species: S. intrudens

Binomial name
- Syagrius intrudens Waterhouse, 1903

= Syagrius intrudens =

Species of beetle

Syagrius intrudens is a species of weevil native to Australia and introduced to Europe.
