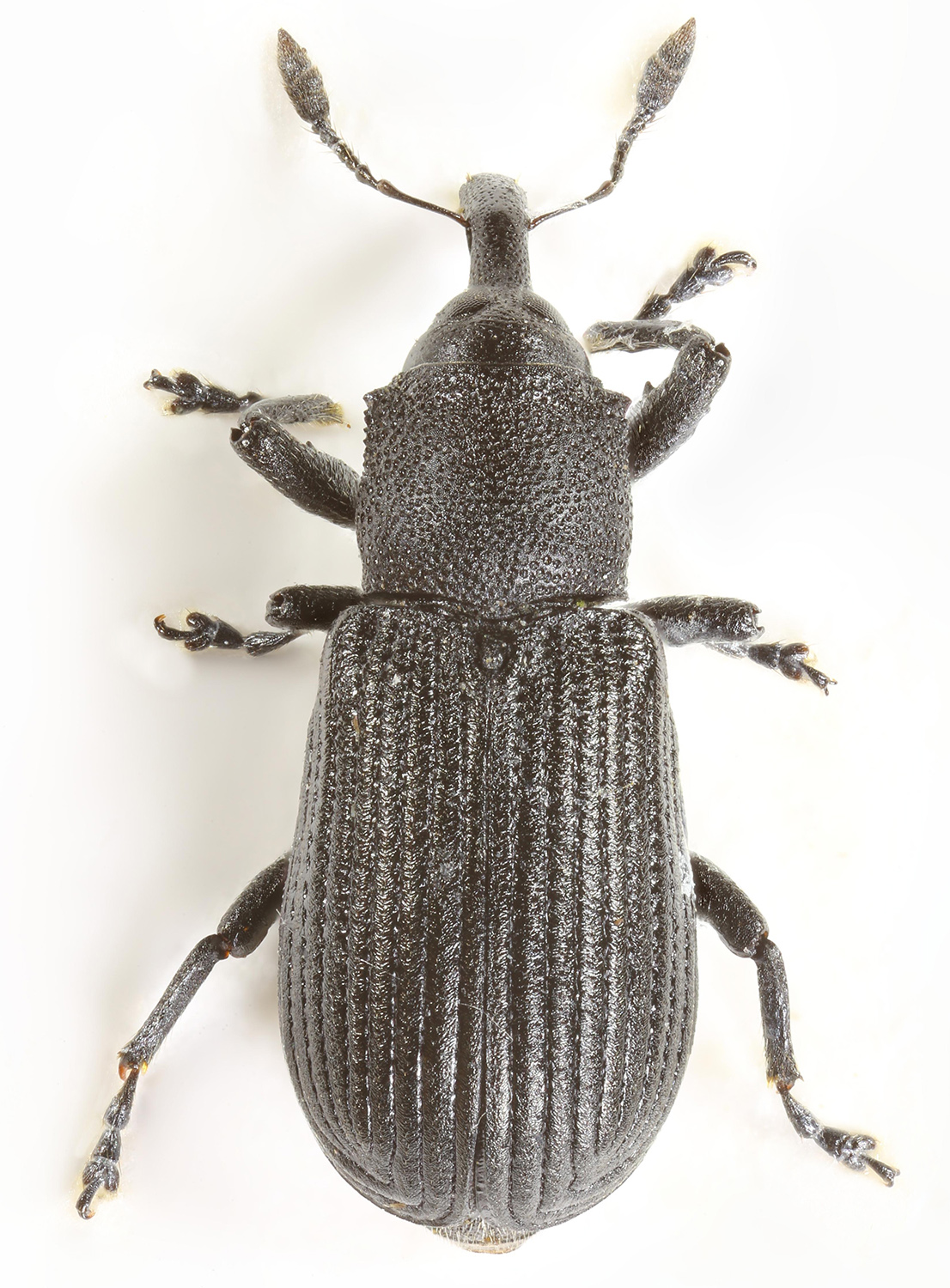
- Magdalis armigera Graig-fechan, North Wales

Scientific classification
- Kingdom: Animalia
- Phylum: Arthropoda
- Clade: Pancrustacea
- Class: Insecta
- Order: Coleoptera
- Suborder: Polyphaga
- Infraorder: Cucujiformia
- Superfamily: Curculionoidea
- Family: Curculionidae
- Genus: Magdalis
- Species: M. armigera

Binomial name
- Magdalis armigera (Geoffroy, 1785)

= Magdalis armigera =

Species of beetle

Magdalis armigera is a species of weevil native to Europe.
