= Sitona lineellus =

Scientific classification
- Kingdom: Animalia
- Phylum: Arthropoda
- Clade: Pancrustacea
- Class: Insecta
- Order: Coleoptera
- Suborder: Polyphaga
- Infraorder: Cucujiformia
- Superfamily: Curculionoidea
- Family: Curculionidae
- Genus: Sitona
- Species: S. lineellus

Binomial name
- Sitona lineellus (Bonsdorff, 1785)

Species of beetle

Sitona lineellus, the alfalfa curculio, is a species of broad-nosed weevil in the beetle family Curculionidae. It is found in North America.

== Subspecies ==
These two subspecies belong to the species Sitona lineellus:

- Sitona lineellus crinitoides Reitter, 1903^{c g}
- Sitona lineellus samniticus F.Solari, 1948^{c g}

Data sources: i = ITIS, c = Catalogue of Life, g = GBIF, b = Bugguide.net
