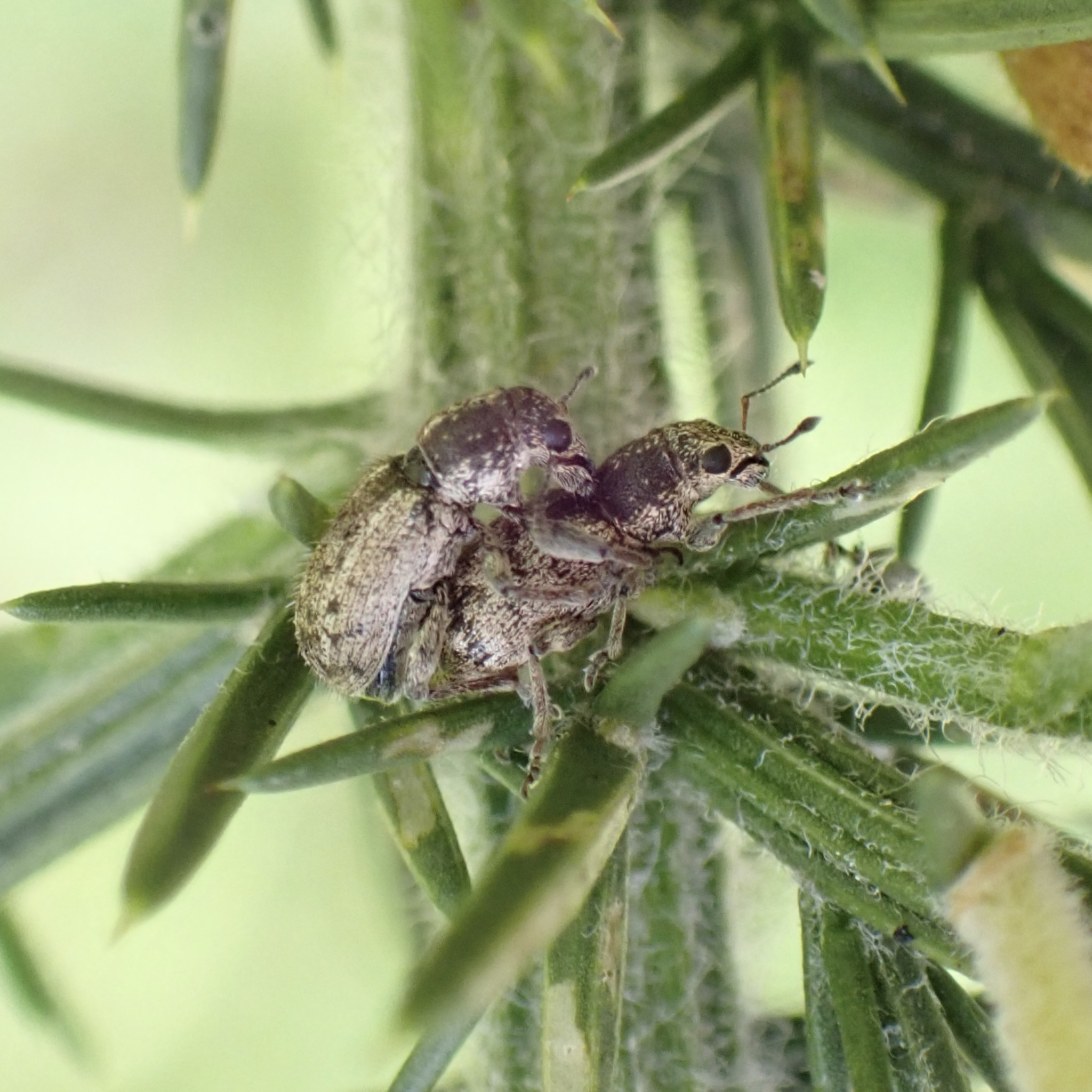

Scientific classification
- Kingdom: Animalia
- Phylum: Arthropoda
- Class: Insecta
- Order: Coleoptera
- Suborder: Polyphaga
- Infraorder: Cucujiformia
- Family: Curculionidae
- Genus: Andrion; Velázquez, 2007
- Species: A. regensteinense

Binomial name
- Andrion regensteinense (Herbst, 1797)

Synonyms
- Curculio regensteinense Herbst, 1797; Sitona regensteinensis (Herbst, 1794)

= Andrion =

Genus of beetles

Andrion is a monotypic genus of beetles belonging to the family Curculionidae. The sole species is Andrion regensteinense.

Andrion feed on legumes in the tribe Genisteae.
