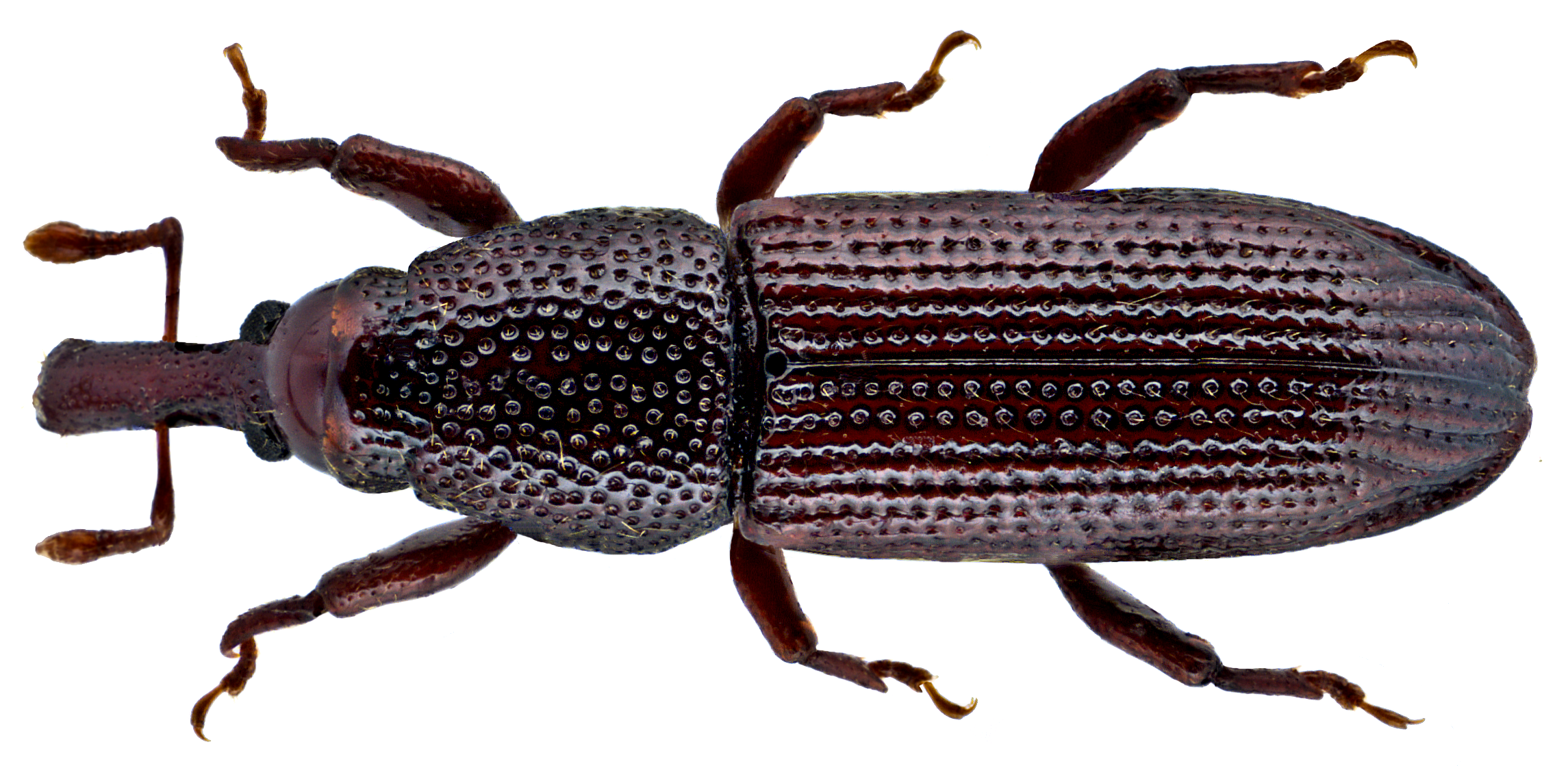

Scientific classification
- Kingdom: Animalia
- Phylum: Arthropoda
- Clade: Pancrustacea
- Class: Insecta
- Order: Coleoptera
- Suborder: Polyphaga
- Infraorder: Cucujiformia
- Superfamily: Curculionoidea
- Family: Curculionidae
- Genus: Euophryum
- Species: E. confine

Binomial name
- Euophryum confine (Broun, 1881)

= Euophryum confine =

Species of beetle

Euophryum confine is a species of weevil native to New Zealand.
