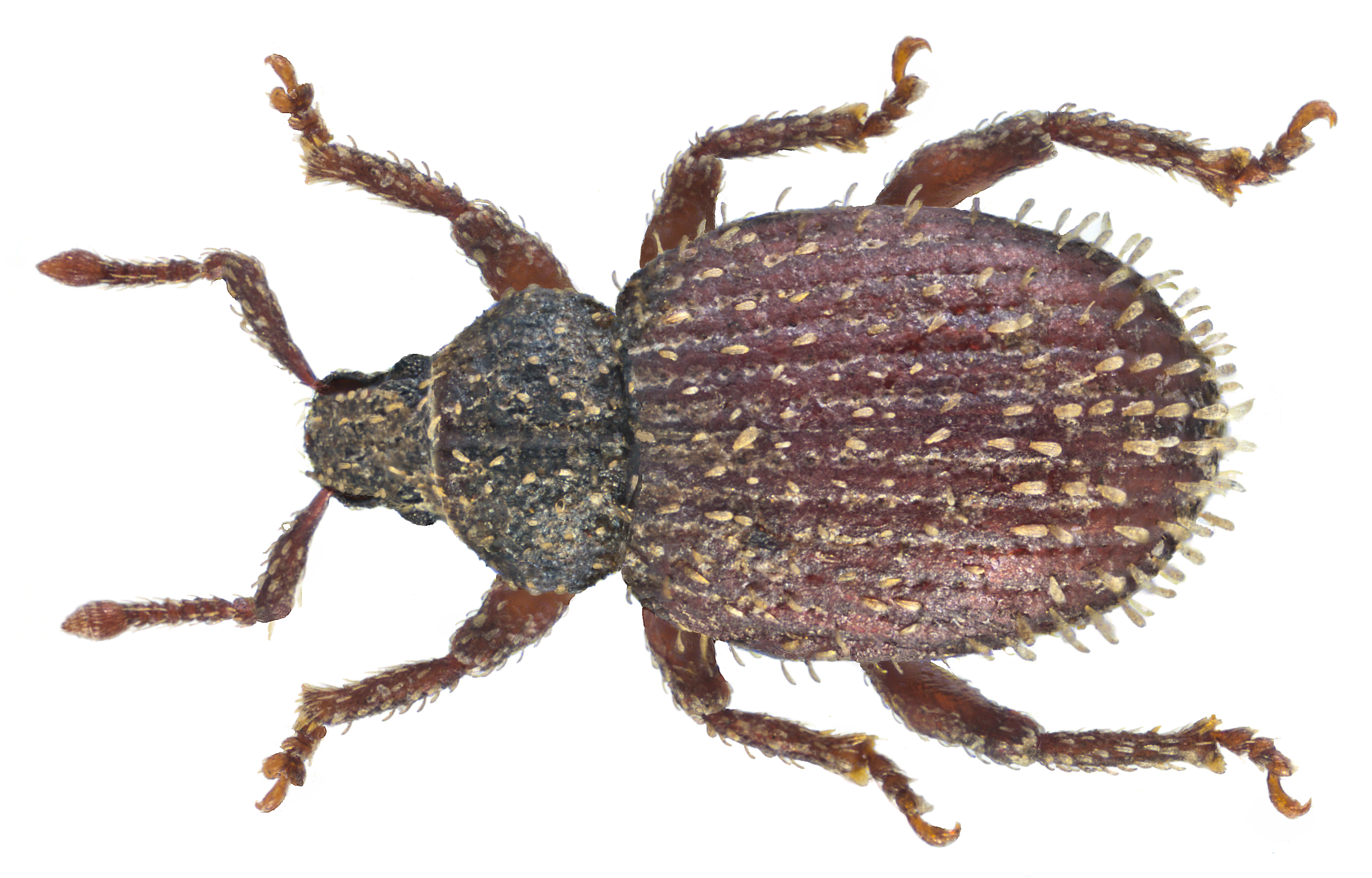
- Trachyphloeus aristatus

Scientific classification
- Kingdom: Animalia
- Phylum: Arthropoda
- Class: Insecta
- Order: Coleoptera
- Suborder: Polyphaga
- Infraorder: Cucujiformia
- Family: Curculionidae
- Genus: Trachyphloeus
- Species: T. aristatus

Binomial name
- Trachyphloeus aristatus (Gyllenhal, 1827)

= Trachyphloeus aristatus =

Species of beetle

Trachyphloeus aristatus is a species of broad-nosed weevil in the beetle family Curculionidae. It is found in North America.
