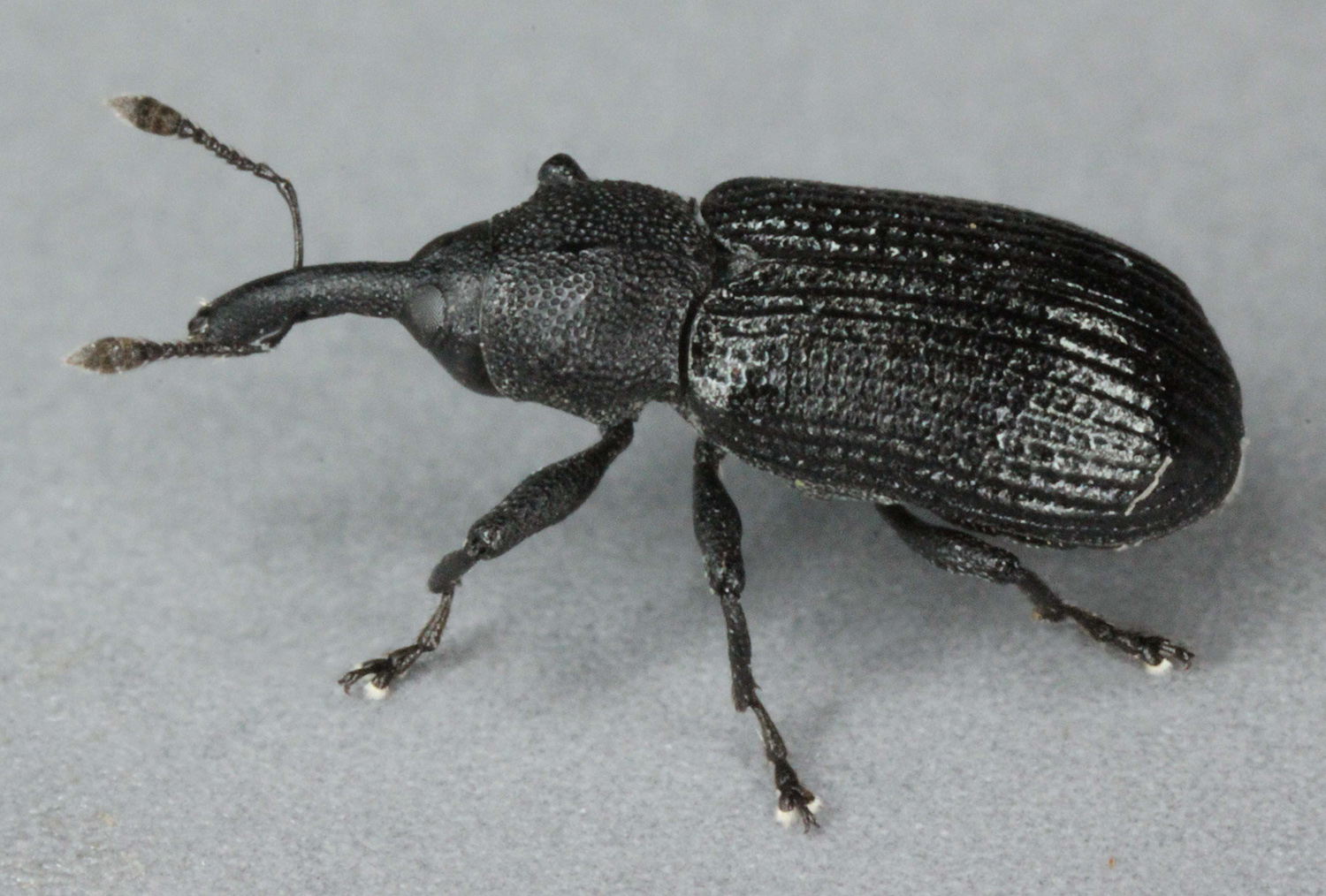
- Magdalis carbonaria Trawscoed, North Wales.

Scientific classification
- Kingdom: Animalia
- Phylum: Arthropoda
- Clade: Pancrustacea
- Class: Insecta
- Order: Coleoptera
- Suborder: Polyphaga
- Infraorder: Cucujiformia
- Family: Curculionidae
- Genus: Magdalis
- Species: M. carbonaria

Binomial name
- Magdalis carbonaria (Linnaeus, 1758)

= Magdalis carbonaria =

Species of beetle

Magdalis carbonaria is a species of weevil native to Europe.
