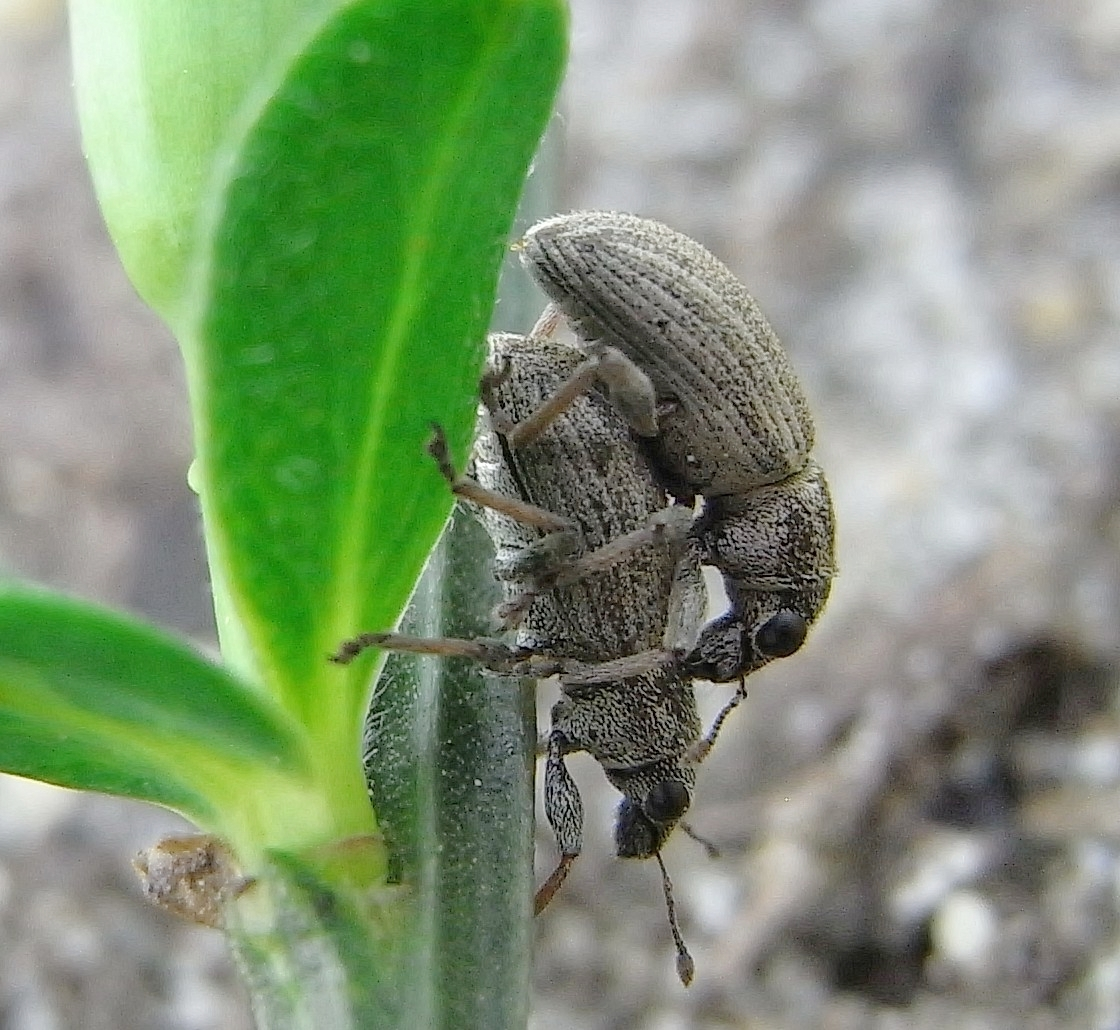

Scientific classification
- Kingdom: Animalia
- Phylum: Arthropoda
- Clade: Pancrustacea
- Class: Insecta
- Order: Coleoptera
- Suborder: Polyphaga
- Infraorder: Cucujiformia
- Superfamily: Curculionoidea
- Family: Curculionidae
- Genus: Sitona
- Species: S. striatellus

Binomial name
- Sitona striatellus (Gyllenhal, 1834)

= Sitona striatellus =

Species of beetle

Sitona striatellus is a species of weevil native to Europe.
