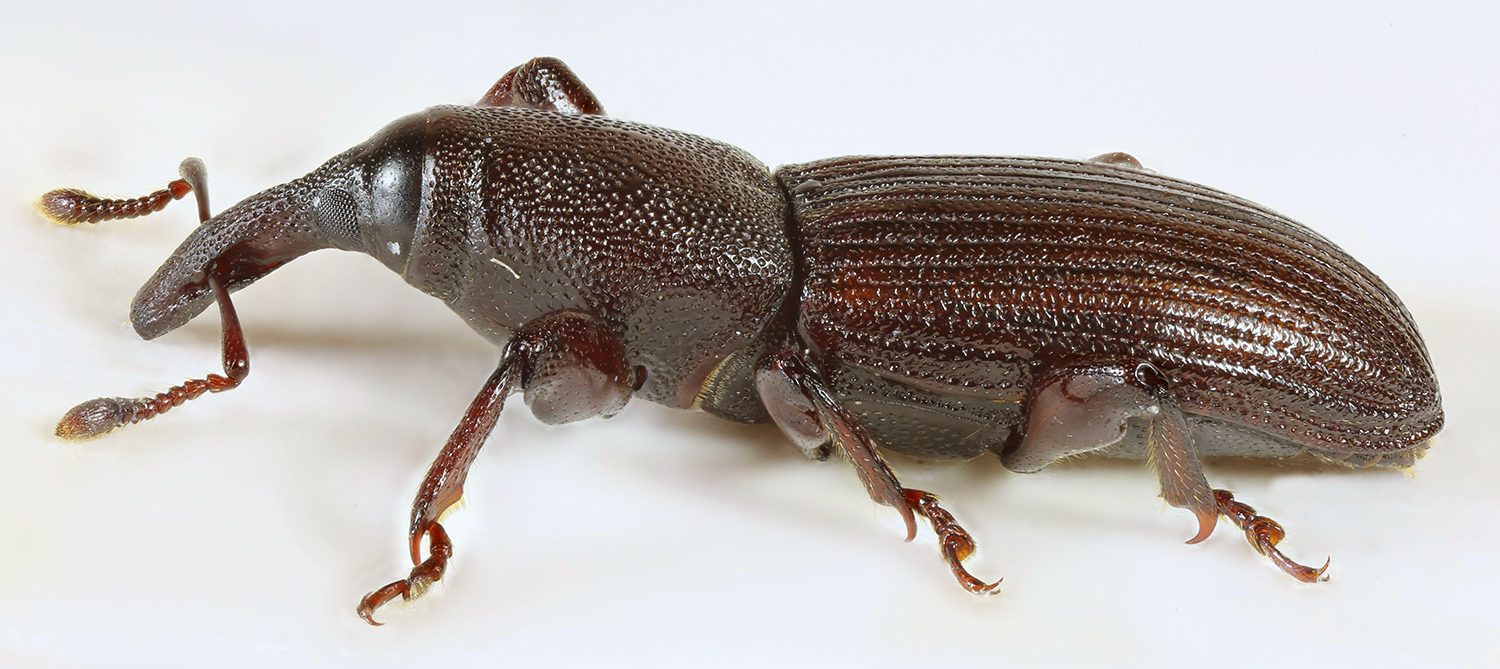
- Rhopalomesites tardyi, Nant Gwrtheyrn, North Wales

Scientific classification
- Kingdom: Animalia
- Phylum: Arthropoda
- Clade: Pancrustacea
- Class: Insecta
- Order: Coleoptera
- Suborder: Polyphaga
- Infraorder: Cucujiformia
- Superfamily: Curculionoidea
- Family: Curculionidae
- Genus: Rhopalomesites
- Species: R. tardyi

Binomial name
- Rhopalomesites tardyi (Curtis, 1825)

= Rhopalomesites tardyi =

Species of beetle

Rhopalomesites tardyi is a species of weevil native to Europe.
