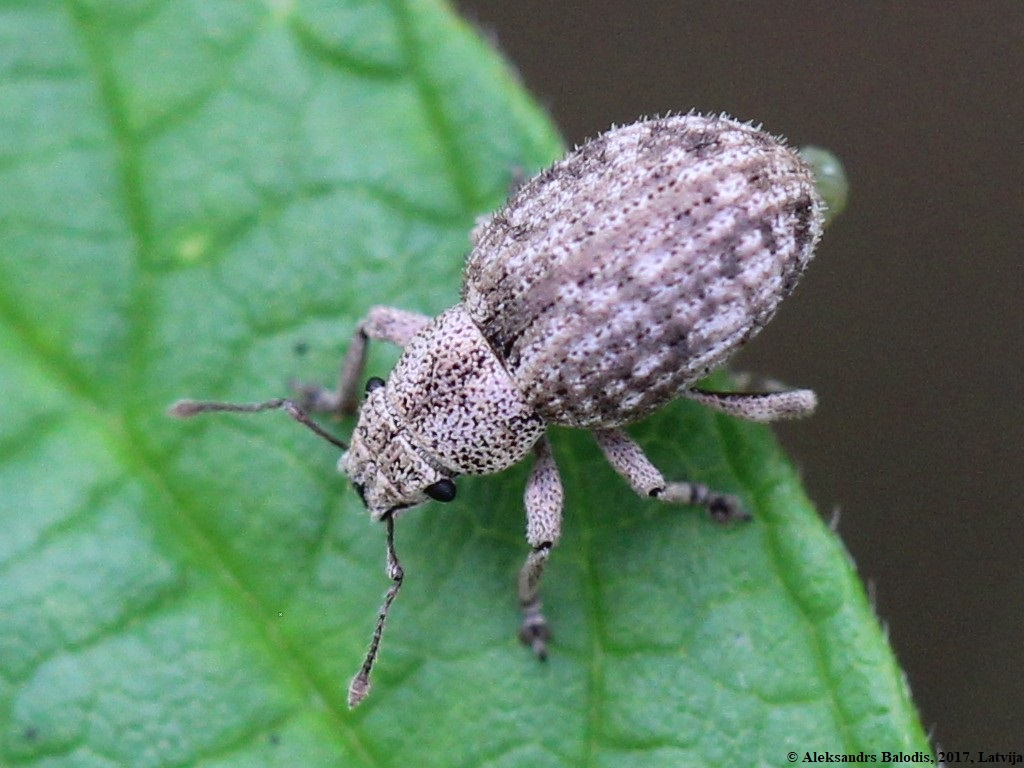

Scientific classification
- Domain: Eukaryota
- Kingdom: Animalia
- Phylum: Arthropoda
- Class: Insecta
- Order: Coleoptera
- Suborder: Polyphaga
- Infraorder: Cucujiformia
- Family: Curculionidae
- Genus: Strophosoma
- Species: S. capitatum

Binomial name
- Strophosoma capitatum (DeGeer, 1775)

= Strophosoma capitatum =

Species of beetle

Strophosoma capitatum is a species of weevil native to Europe.
