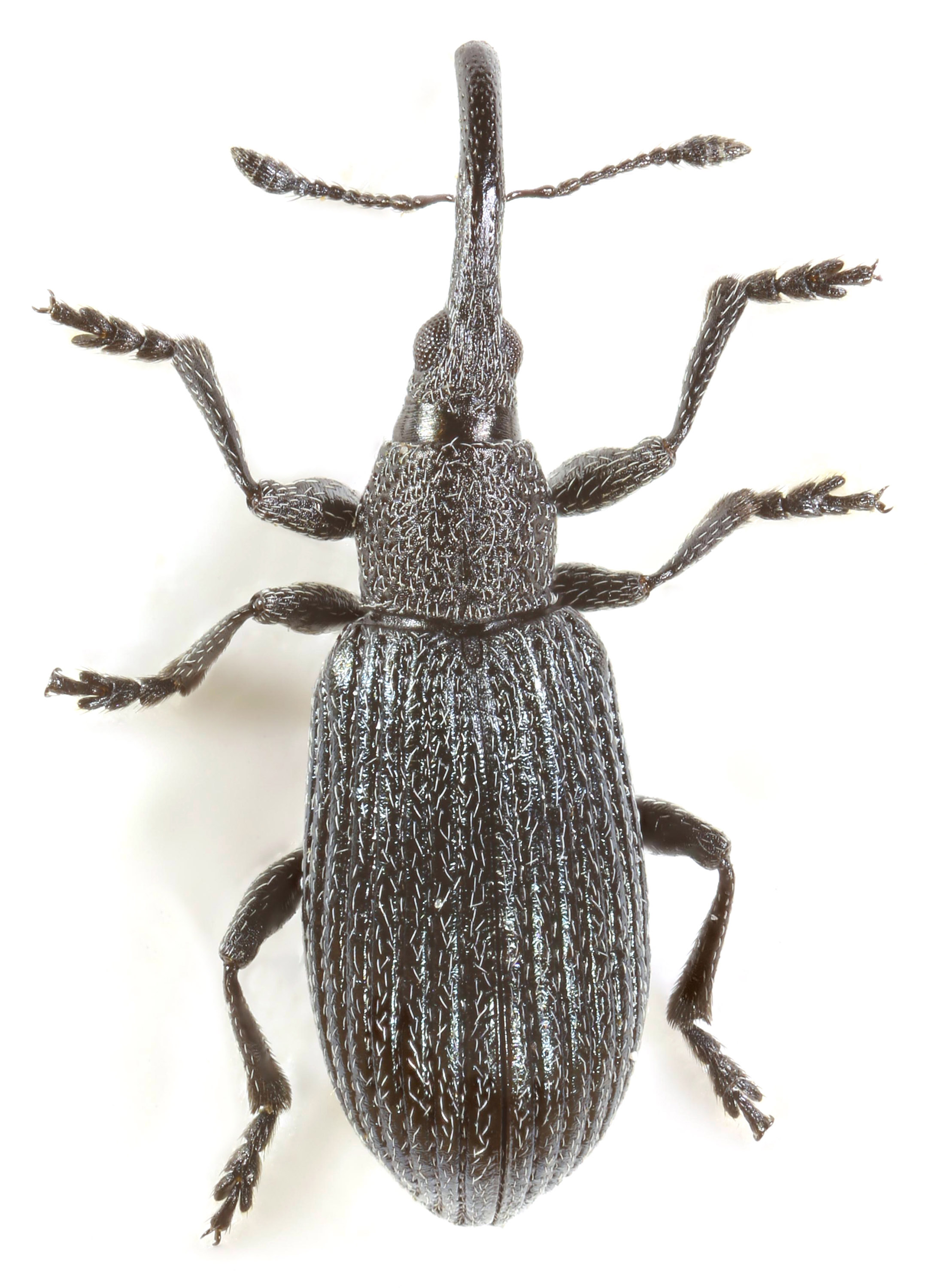

Scientific classification
- Domain: Eukaryota
- Kingdom: Animalia
- Phylum: Arthropoda
- Class: Insecta
- Order: Coleoptera
- Suborder: Polyphaga
- Infraorder: Cucujiformia
- Family: Brentidae
- Genus: Stenopterapion
- Species: S. meliloti

Binomial name
- Stenopterapion meliloti (Kirby, 1808)

= Stenopterapion meliloti =

Species of beetle

Stenopterapion meliloti is a species of pear-shaped weevil in the family of beetles known as Brentidae.

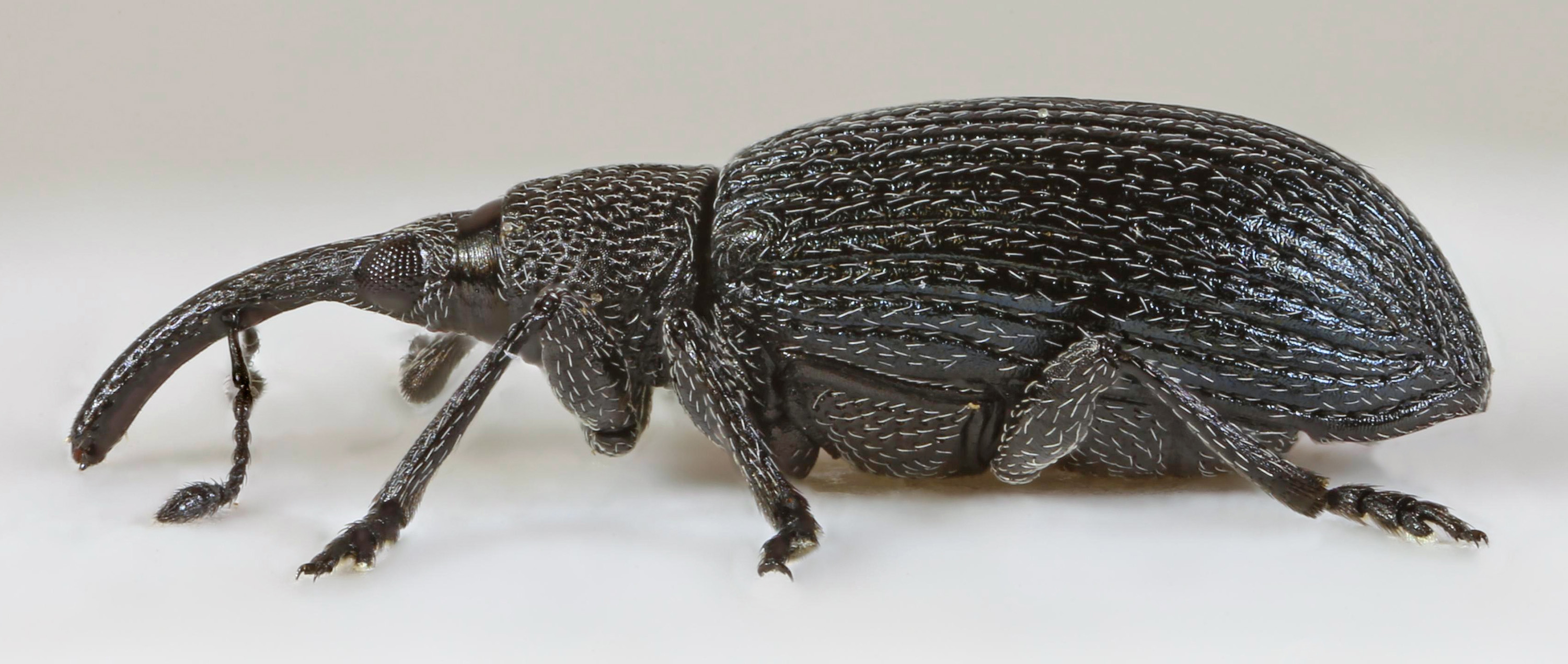
