= Trachyphloeus asperatus =

Scientific classification
- Kingdom: Animalia
- Phylum: Arthropoda
- Class: Insecta
- Order: Coleoptera
- Suborder: Polyphaga
- Infraorder: Cucujiformia
- Family: Curculionidae
- Genus: Trachyphloeus
- Species: T. asperatus

Binomial name
- Trachyphloeus asperatus Boheman, 1843

Synonyms
- Trachyphloeus olivieri Bedel, 1883

Species of beetle

Trachyphloeus asperatus is a species of broad-nosed weevil in the beetle family Curculionidae. It is found in North America.
