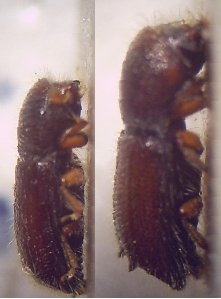
- Female (left) and male (right) animal

Scientific classification
- Domain: Eukaryota
- Kingdom: Animalia
- Phylum: Arthropoda
- Class: Insecta
- Order: Coleoptera
- Suborder: Polyphaga
- Infraorder: Cucujiformia
- Family: Curculionidae
- Genus: Xylocleptes
- Species: X. bispinus

Binomial name
- Xylocleptes bispinus (Duftschmid, 1825)

= Xylocleptes bispinus =

Species of beetle

Xylocleptes bispinus is a snout beetle from the subfamily of Scolytinae. It builds its nests in the bark of clematis shrubs.

== Characteristics ==
The beetles grow to a length of 2.3 to 2.4 millimetres and feature a cylindrical body. The notum is granular in the fore part and dotted in the rear section, whereby the "dots" are constituted by small hollows. Seen from above, the notum shields the insect's head. The males' elytra's onsets are emarginated. The rear parts of the males' elytra each feature a sharp spike while the female imago's elytra have a smooth furrow and a row of grains (sexual dimorphism). The antennae and final segments of the legs are yellow, the rest of the legs is auburn. The animal is otherwise coloured glossy brown and is hairy.

== Proliferation ==
The species can be found in southern, central and eastern Europe as well as in Denmark and Great Britain.

== Life ==
The bug settles on Clematis vitalba and Clematis orientalis, both being climbing shrubs. The larvae eat tunnels along the plant's stem, directly below the thin bark. The species is polygamous.
