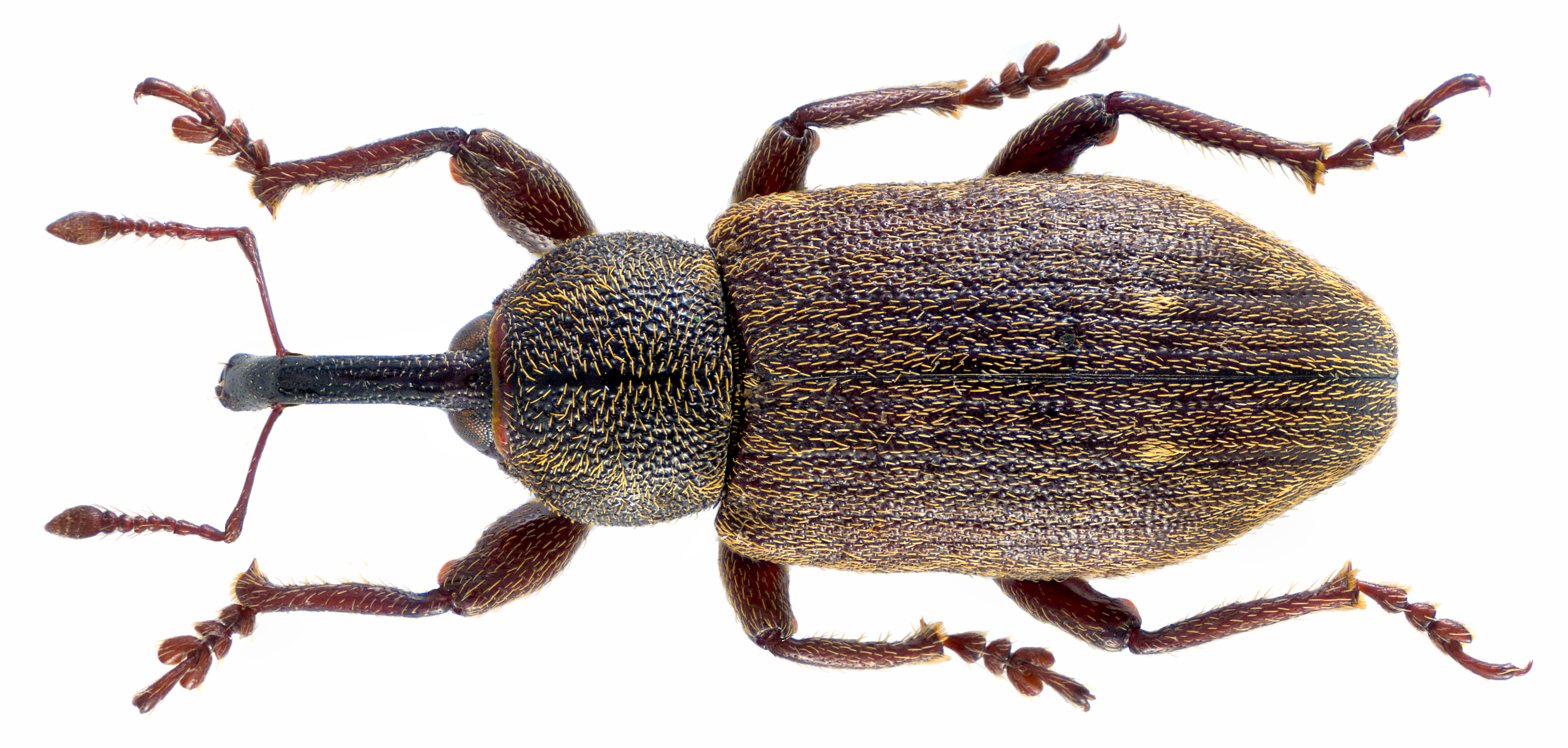
- Tournotaris bimaculatus 7.1 mm (6-10 mm)

Scientific classification
- Kingdom: Animalia
- Phylum: Arthropoda
- Clade: Pancrustacea
- Class: Insecta
- Order: Coleoptera
- Suborder: Polyphaga
- Infraorder: Cucujiformia
- Superfamily: Curculionoidea
- Family: Brachyceridae
- Genus: Tournotaris
- Species: T. bimaculata

Binomial name
- Tournotaris bimaculata (Fabricius, 1792)

= Tournotaris bimaculata =

Species of beetle

Tournotaris bimaculata is a species of weevil native to Europe.
