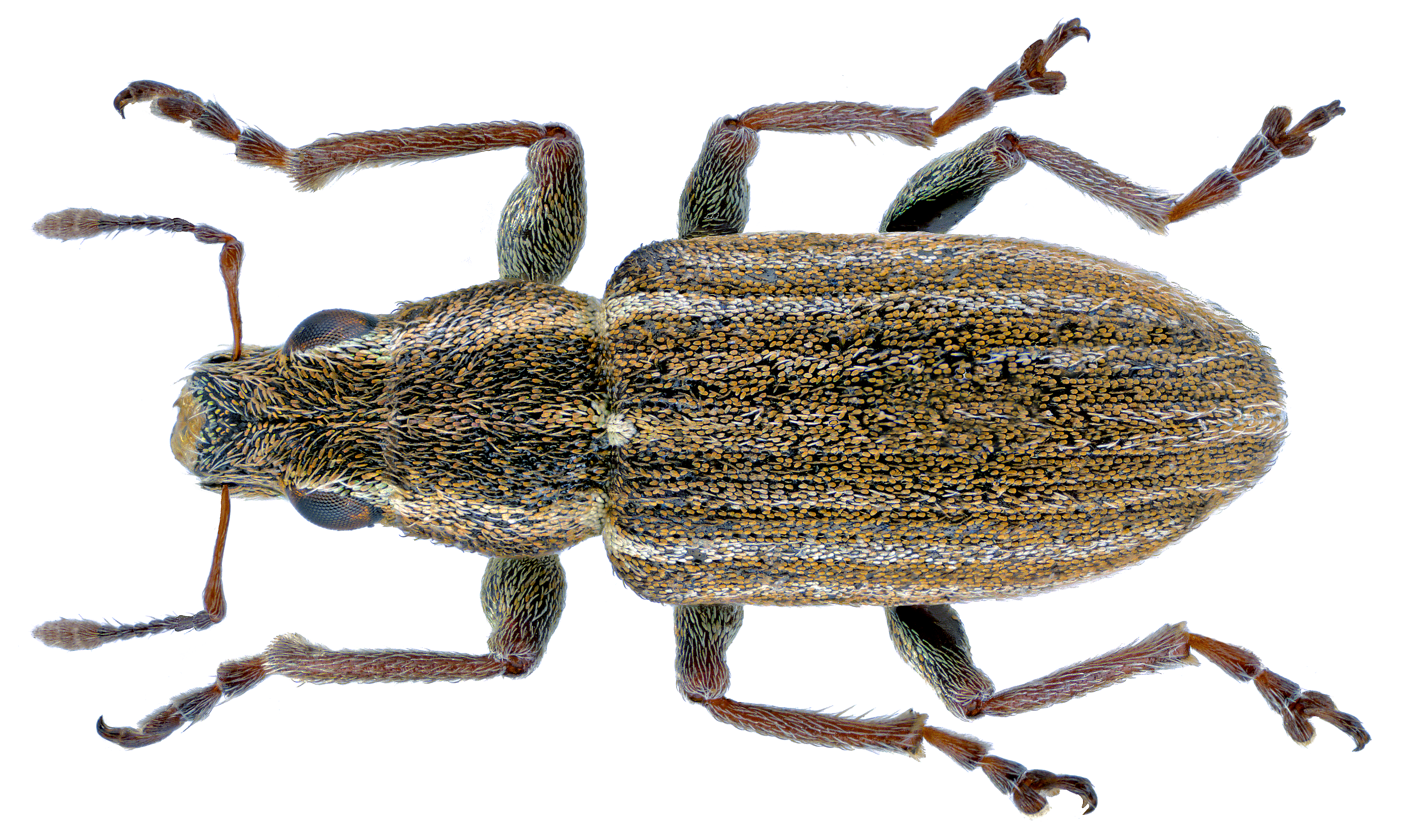

Scientific classification
- Kingdom: Animalia
- Phylum: Arthropoda
- Clade: Pancrustacea
- Class: Insecta
- Order: Coleoptera
- Suborder: Polyphaga
- Infraorder: Cucujiformia
- Superfamily: Curculionoidea
- Family: Curculionidae
- Genus: Sitona
- Species: S. lineatus

Binomial name
- Sitona lineatus Linnaeus, 1758

= Sitona lineatus =

Species of beetle

Sitona lineatus, the pea and bean weevil or pea leaf weevil, is a species of weevil with a Palearctic distribution. It is a common pest of beans, peas, and other plants in the family Fabaceae.

Adult S. lineatus beetles measure 3.4–5.4 mm (0.13–0.21 in) in length. They are characterized by a series of colored scales arranged in alternating lines (striae) on the elytra; it is from this characteristic where the species gets its name lineatus meaning 'lined' or 'striped'. The head and pronotum also have fine pointed setae amongst the scales. The antennae are clubbed, pointed and preceded by 7 segments. The femora is dark, but tibiae and tarsi are red. As a member of Order Coleoptera (beetles) their forewings are modified to form hardened covers over the thorax and abdomen, with the hindwings for flight underneath.

== Distribution ==
Sitona lineatus is native to Europe and North Africa, and is considered an invasive species in North America. In North America, they are typically found in the western prairie provinces of Canada (Alberta, Saskatchewan, Manitoba) , from where they show expansion toward the Canada/USA border into North Dakota, and north into higher latitudes of Alberta. This expansion is mainly limited by precipitation, and less so by temperature. Climate models predict the potential for expansion further north.

== Behavior and life cycle ==
S. lineatus are univoltine species that are oligophagous within the Fabaceae plants. Adults will overwinter in the field margins of pea, bean crops, or migrate to fields of alfalfa before the onset of winter.Their emergence from winter dormancy is related to temperature, as adults have been seen to prefer temperatures of 12.5 - 13 °C as an indicator to leave their winter site habitat, with wind currents being the main mechanism by which they find and colonize new crop habitats. Both males and females have been shown to have increased longevity when feeding on pea plants as opposed to the alfalfa they eat over winter and in spring prior to migration. Increased longevity for females translates to higher fecundity, and females will disperse from areas of high population density to areas with low density to maximize their egg to plant ratio. Females that feed on pea crops generally have a higher reproductive capability than ones that feed more on alfalfa, it is advantageous to migrate from the field margins and winter shelters to the new pea plants emerging in spring. After the respective reproductive periods in spring for males and females, adults will feed on the leaves of Fabaceae plants, and larvae will burrow into the soil after hatching where they feed primarily on Rhizobium at the nodules of the root system. During their feeding underground, larvae go through 5 stages of growth (instars), and emerge as adults to feed on the crop above ground just as their parents in mid summer. In late summer (August) the surviving adults leave the crop plants and migrate to the field margins, alfalfa fields, or other areas of habitat that make suitable shelter for the overwintering period of dormancy.

== Agricultural impact ==
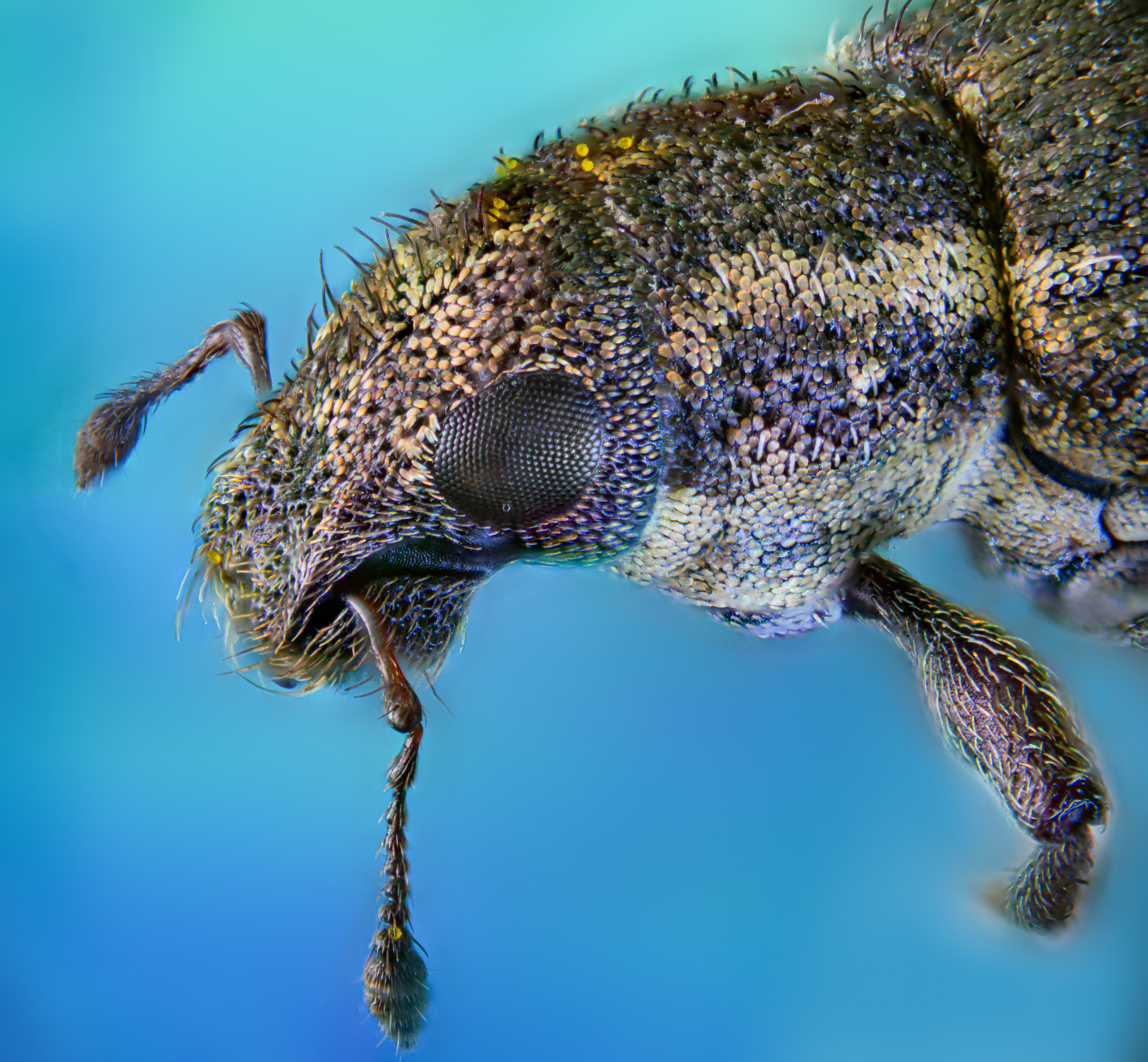
Enlarged insect head.

The impact of this invasive species can be difficult to estimate accurately as its distribution is widespread, and there are often abiotic factors (temperature, precipitation, growing season) that determine the success of S. lineatus which are inconsistent within its indigenous and invasive habitat ranges (Europe, Africa, and North America). There is a way to focus on these types of pests and how to look at them in terms of potential cropland for their habitation. In 2018 in Canada, for example, approximately 3.6 million acres of pulse crops were grown, valuable domestically and as an export, the yields can be diminished as much as 28% from feeding activities of S. lineatus. Damage to pea and bean crops can be severely impacted by S. lineatus feeding, due to the fact that both the root Rhizobium and foliage are fed upon by larvae and adults respectively. These crops are important as food resources and as nitrogen fixing plants, an ability which is reduced when larval feeding on rhizobium is significant enough. The damage to root nodules from hosting larvae can lead to decrease pod production, lower protein content of peas or beans, and the necessity of artificially fertilizing pulse crops and the increased cost associated with this,

== Management ==
Strategies for pest management has led to research relating to farming practices, biological agents, pesticides, and soil manipulation in order to mitigate harmful effects towards pulse crops by insects like S. lineatus. Farming practices like tilling can also make an impact on populations of S. lineatus, with the implementation of no till farming. Using this strategy, researchers have shown that S. lineatus prefers to colonize farmland that undergoes conventional tilling practices vs no tilling ones. Some strategies involve supplementing crops with nitrogen-containing fertilizers to increase yields, where fertilized plants showed increases in yields despite root nodule damage. S. lineatus can also be targeted by introducing to its habitat species of beetles that are natural predators of both egg deposits and grown adults. In a laboratory study on insect pathogens it was shown that introducing biopesticides, in the form of toxic materials produced by bacterium, to a population of S. lineatus can have beneficial effects on mortality rates of exposed individuals. Also, the potential to add insect pathogens directly to soil as a preventative measure could possibly create a pre-delivered natural buffer defense against the larvae that are responsible for damage to rhizobium bearing root nodules.

== Response to climate change ==
A long term prediction for the future of food crop pests like S. lineatus indicates that increasing temperatures can facilitate the increase in population abundance with negative consequences for plants that struggle with change, and benefits to pests like increased life spans and the survivorship of more and overlapping generations. Air temperature has been shown to have increased over a 30 year period retroactively from 2020, which could enable these insects to leave their winter habitat earlier in spring to colonize crop land with greater ease. If the trends seen over the last 30 years of study continue, pest management solutions may increase in importance to ensure the viability of pulse crops, and mitigate the worst of the effects of pest infestations.
