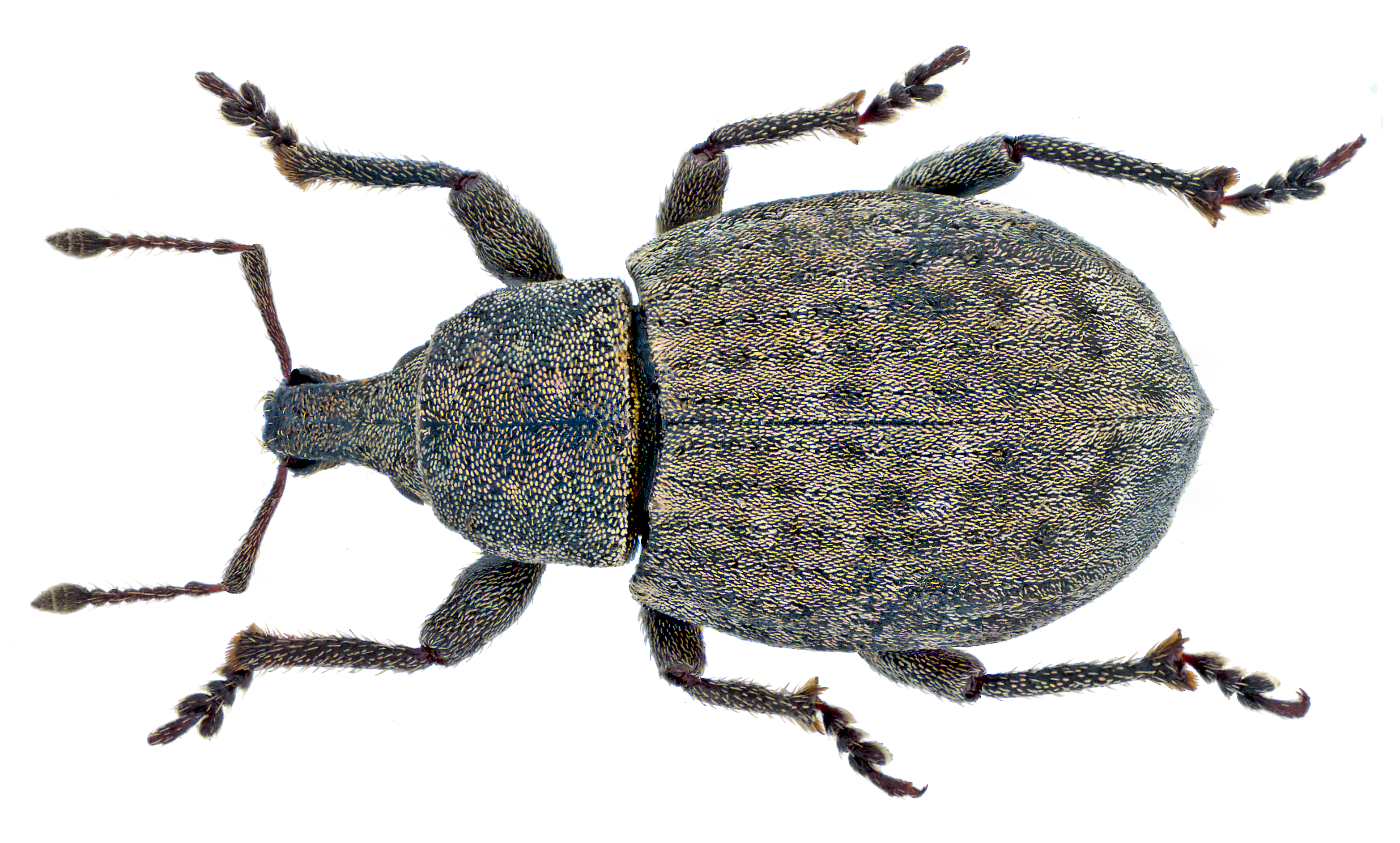
- Tropiphorus terricola

Scientific classification
- Domain: Eukaryota
- Kingdom: Animalia
- Phylum: Arthropoda
- Class: Insecta
- Order: Coleoptera
- Suborder: Polyphaga
- Infraorder: Cucujiformia
- Family: Curculionidae
- Subfamily: Entiminae
- Tribe: Tropiphorini; Marseul, 1863

Genera
- See text

Synonyms
- Leptopiini

= Tropiphorini =

Tribe of beetles

Tropiphorini is a tribe of weevils in the subfamily Entiminae.

== Genera ==
Achorius – Adaleres – Agatholobus – Amisallus – Amnemus – Amphidees – Anametis – Baryopadus – Basedowia – Bastactes – Bolivianus – Bothynorhynchus – Brachyolus – Byrsopages – Catasarcus – Catodryobiolus – Catoptes – Cecyropa – Chaodius – Cimbocera – Cindynus – Cnemotricha – Connatichela – Crocidema – Cylindromus – Cyphometopus – Dasydema – Decienus – Derelobus – Diamimus – Dichoxenus – Dirotognathus – Dyslobus – Echinopeplus – Ecrizothis – Elytrocallus – Enchymus – Entyus – Erepsimus – Essolithna – Eurynotia – Geniocremnus – Geonemides – Hadrorhinus – Haplolobus – Hellerius – Heteractus – Heterexis – Homaleptops – Homalorhinus – Hustachius – Hybreoleptops – Inophloeus – Irenimus – Leptopinara – Leptopius – Lipothyrea – Loxorhinus – Lysizone – Malvinius – Mandalotus – Megalometides – Megalometis – Melanolemma – Micramphidees – Miloderes – Miostictus – Neoevas – Neohustachius – Nicaeana – Oclandius – Ocynoma – Odontorhinus – Onesorus – Opseotapinotus – Orimodema – Orthomycterus – Paelocharis – Panscopus – Pantomorops – Paracimbocera – Paraleptops – Paranametis – Parergus – Peripagis – Peritaxia – Perperus – Phyxelis – Piazocaulus – Polycomus – Polyphrades – Priocnemus – Protolobus – Psapharus – Pseudoleptops – Pseudomelactus – Pseudorimus – Rhigopsis – Rhyparophilus – Sargon – Sclerococcus – Scotasmus – Sepiomus – Spartecerus – Stenocorynus – Strangaliodes – Synaptonyx – Synosomus – Tetraphysus – Thesius – Thotmus – Tropiphorus – Uroleptops – Vitavitus – Vossius – Xynaea – Xyneella – Zenagraphus – Zymaus
