= Basedowia =

Basedowia may refer to:

- Basedowia (plant), a flowering plant genus in the family Asteraceae
- Basedowia (beetle), a beetle genus in the family Curculionidae
