= Bonsdorff =

Bonsdorff is a surname. Notable people with this surname include:

- Elsa Bonsdorff (1883–1973), Finnish politician
- Evert Julius Bonsdorff (1810–1898), Finnish physician and professor
- Gabriel Bonsdorff (1762–1831), Finnish entomologist

== See also ==
- Von Bonsdorff (surname)
