= Chiloneus elegans =

Scientific classification
- Kingdom: Animalia
- Phylum: Arthropoda
- Class: Insecta
- Order: Coleoptera
- Suborder: Polyphaga
- Infraorder: Cucujiformia
- Family: Curculionidae
- Genus: Chiloneus
- Species: C. elegans

Binomial name
- Chiloneus elegans Weise in Reitt., 1906

Species of beetle

Chiloneus elegans is a species of weevils in the tribe Sciaphilini. It is found in Greece.
