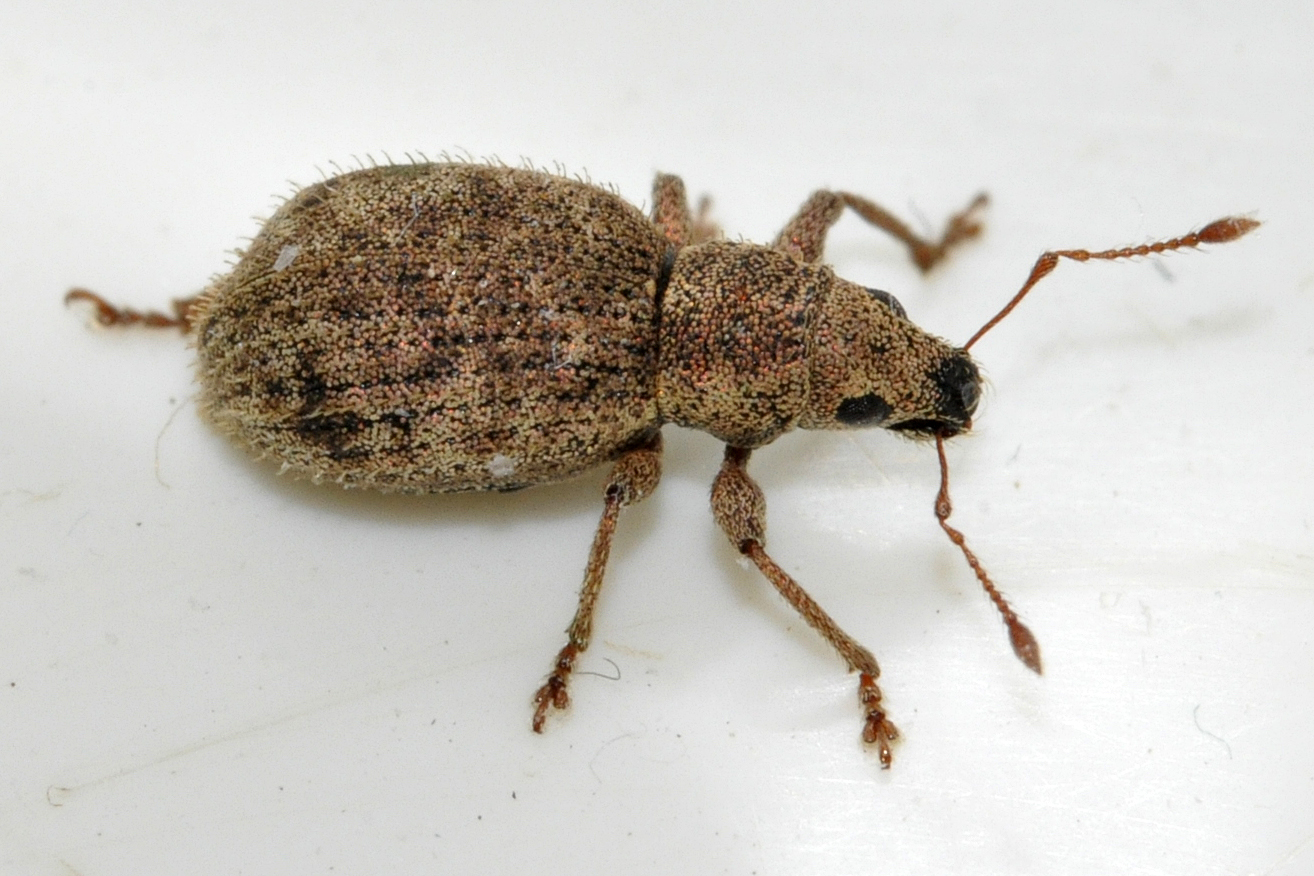

Scientific classification
- Kingdom: Animalia
- Phylum: Arthropoda
- Clade: Pancrustacea
- Class: Insecta
- Order: Coleoptera
- Suborder: Polyphaga
- Infraorder: Cucujiformia
- Superfamily: Curculionoidea
- Family: Curculionidae
- Genus: Sciaphilus
- Species: S. asperatus

Binomial name
- Sciaphilus asperatus (Bonsdorff, 1785)

= Sciaphilus asperatus =

Species of beetle

Sciaphilus asperatus is a species of weevil native to Europe. Larvae develop in spring and summer, as this beetle typically overwinters in its adult stage. Females lay between 450 and 700 eggs in the wild.
