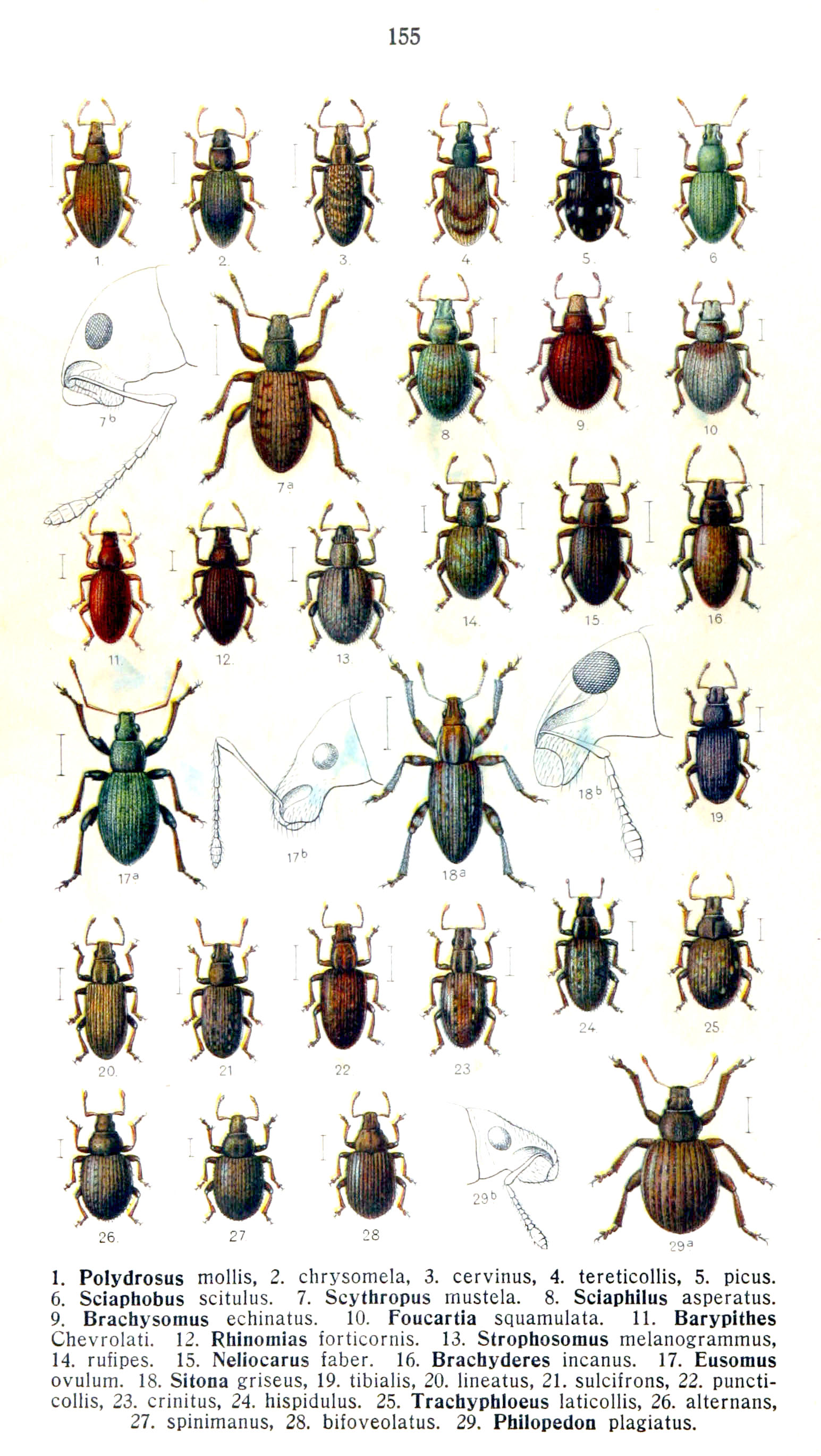
- Figure 9

Scientific classification
- Kingdom: Animalia
- Phylum: Arthropoda
- Clade: Pancrustacea
- Class: Insecta
- Order: Coleoptera
- Suborder: Polyphaga
- Infraorder: Cucujiformia
- Superfamily: Curculionoidea
- Family: Curculionidae
- Genus: Brachysomus
- Species: B. echinatus

Binomial name
- Brachysomus echinatus (Bonsdorff, 1785)

= Brachysomus echinatus =

Species of beetle

Brachysomus echinatus is a species of weevil native to Europe.
