= Thesius =

Thesius may refer to:

- An alternative spelling for Theseus, the mythical founder-king of Athens
- Thesius (beetle), a beetle genus in the tribe Tropiphorini
