= Tropiphorus obtusus =

Scientific classification
- Kingdom: Animalia
- Phylum: Arthropoda
- Clade: Pancrustacea
- Class: Insecta
- Order: Coleoptera
- Suborder: Polyphaga
- Infraorder: Cucujiformia
- Superfamily: Curculionoidea
- Family: Curculionidae
- Genus: Tropiphorus
- Species: T. obtusus

Binomial name
- Tropiphorus obtusus (Bonsdorff, 1785)

Species of beetle

Tropiphorus obtusus is a species of broad-nosed weevil in the beetle family Curculionidae. It is found in North America.
