= Miloderes =

Scientific classification
- Kingdom: Animalia
- Phylum: Arthropoda
- Class: Insecta
- Order: Coleoptera
- Suborder: Polyphaga
- Infraorder: Cucujiformia
- Family: Curculionidae
- Tribe: Tropiphorini
- Genus: Miloderes; Casey, 1888

Genus of beetles

Miloderes is a genus of broad-nosed weevils in the beetle family Curculionidae. There are about nine described species in Miloderes.

== Species ==
These nine species belong to the genus Miloderes:

- Miloderes allredi Tanner, 1974^{i b}
- Miloderes amargosensis Van Dam & O?Brien, 2015^{c g}
- Miloderes mercuryensis Tanner, 1966^{i c g}
- Miloderes nelsoni Kissinger, 1960^{i c g}
- Miloderes panamintensis Van Dam & O?Brien, 2015^{c g}
- Miloderes setosus Casey, 1888^{i c g}
- Miloderes tingi Tanner, 1974^{i c g}
- Miloderes ubehebensis Van Dam & O?Brien, 2015^{c g}
- Miloderes viridis Pierce, 1909^{i c g}

Data sources: i = ITIS, c = Catalogue of Life, g = GBIF, b = Bugguide.net
