= Dichoxenus =

Scientific classification
- Domain: Eukaryota
- Kingdom: Animalia
- Phylum: Arthropoda
- Class: Insecta
- Order: Coleoptera
- Suborder: Polyphaga
- Infraorder: Cucujiformia
- Family: Curculionidae
- Tribe: Tropiphorini
- Genus: Dichoxenus; Horn, 1876

Genus of beetles

Dichoxenus is a genus of broad-nosed weevils in the beetle family Curculionidae. There are at least four described species in Dichoxenus.

== Species ==
These four species belong to the genus Dichoxenus:

- Dichoxenus occidentalis Sleeper, 1956^{i c g}
- Dichoxenus setiger Horn, 1876^{i c g b}
- Dichoxenus setosus (Blatchley, 1916)^{i c g}
- Dichoxenus tessellatus Sleeper, 1956^{i c g}

Data sources: i = ITIS, c = Catalogue of Life, g = GBIF, b = Bugguide.net
