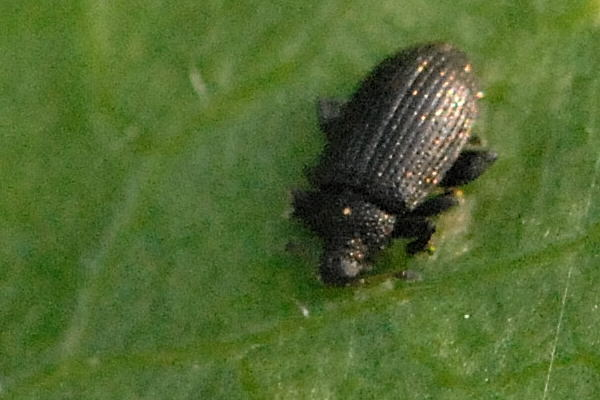
- Brachysomus hirtus

Scientific classification
- Domain: Eukaryota
- Kingdom: Animalia
- Phylum: Arthropoda
- Class: Insecta
- Order: Coleoptera
- Suborder: Polyphaga
- Infraorder: Cucujiformia
- Family: Curculionidae
- Subfamily: Entiminae
- Tribe: Sciaphilini
- Genus: Brachysomus; Schoenherr, 1823

= Brachysomus =

Genus of beetles

Brachysomus is a genus of beetles belonging to the family Curculionidae.

The genus was first described by Schoenherr in 1823.

Synonym: Platytarsus Schoenherr, 1840

Species:

- Brachysomus echinatus
