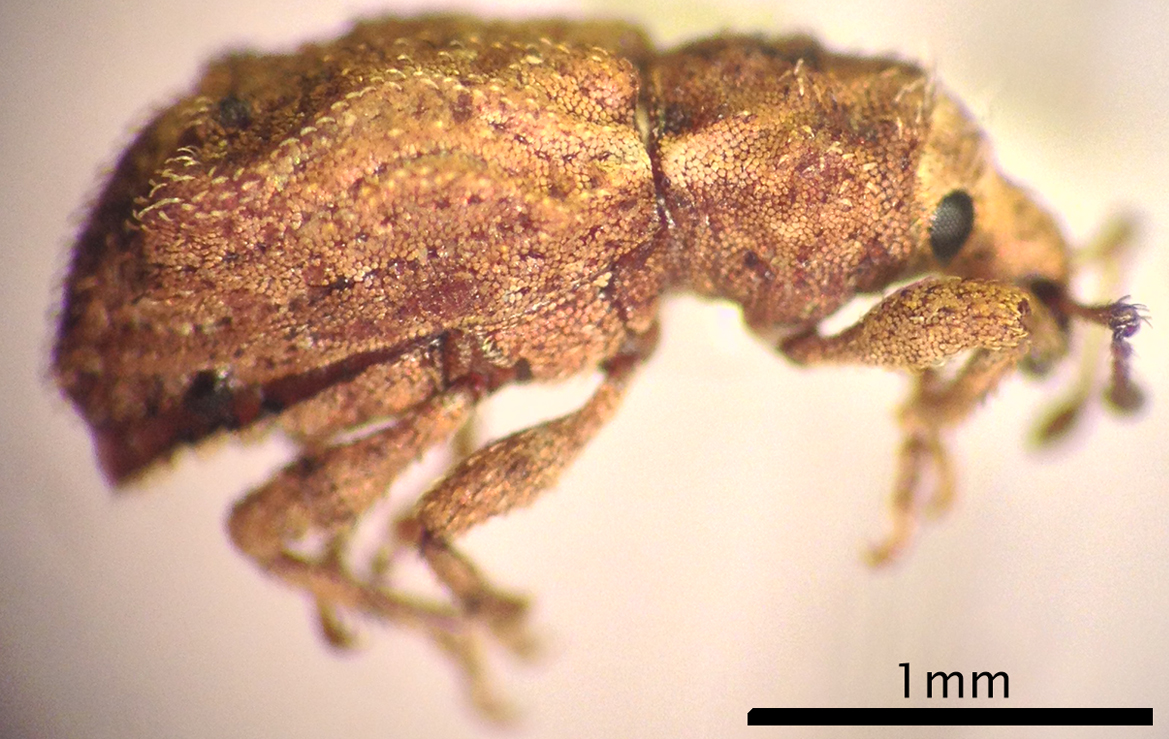
- Brachyolus bagooides from Otago, New Zealand

Scientific classification
- Kingdom: Animalia
- Phylum: Arthropoda
- Class: Insecta
- Order: Coleoptera
- Suborder: Polyphaga
- Infraorder: Cucujiformia
- Family: Curculionidae
- Genus: Brachyolus
- Species: B. bagooides

Binomial name
- Brachyolus bagooides Sharp 1886.

= Brachyolus bagooides =

Species of beetle

Brachyolus bagooides is a broad-nosed weevil that is endemic to New Zealand. This species can be found in private gardens in Dunedin and the Rock and Pillar Range of Otago.
