= Rhigopsis =

Scientific classification
- Kingdom: Animalia
- Phylum: Arthropoda
- Class: Insecta
- Order: Coleoptera
- Suborder: Polyphaga
- Infraorder: Cucujiformia
- Family: Curculionidae
- Tribe: Tropiphorini
- Genus: Rhigopsis; LeConte, 1874

Genus of beetles

Rhigopsis is a genus of broad-nosed weevils in the beetle family Curculionidae. There are at least two described species in Rhigopsis.

== Species ==
These two species belong to the genus Rhigopsis:

- Rhigopsis effracta LeConte, 1874^{i c g b}
- Rhigopsis simplex Horn, 1894^{c g}

Data sources: i = ITIS, c = Catalogue of Life, g = GBIF, b = Bugguide.net
