= Miloderes allredi =

Scientific classification
- Domain: Eukaryota
- Kingdom: Animalia
- Phylum: Arthropoda
- Class: Insecta
- Order: Coleoptera
- Suborder: Polyphaga
- Infraorder: Cucujiformia
- Family: Curculionidae
- Genus: Miloderes
- Species: M. allredi

Binomial name
- Miloderes allredi Tanner, 1974

Species of beetle

Miloderes allredi is a species of broad-nosed weevil in the beetle family Curculionidae. It is found in North America.
