= Adaleres =

Scientific classification
- Kingdom: Animalia
- Phylum: Arthropoda
- Clade: Pancrustacea
- Class: Insecta
- Order: Coleoptera
- Suborder: Polyphaga
- Infraorder: Cucujiformia
- Superfamily: Curculionoidea
- Family: Curculionidae
- Tribe: Tropiphorini
- Genus: Adaleres; Casey, 1895

Genus of beetles

Adaleres is a genus of broad-nosed weevils in the beetle family Curculionidae. There are at least three described species in Adaleres.

== Species ==
These three species belong to the genus Adaleres:

- Adaleres flandersi Van Dyke, 1935^{i c g b}
- Adaleres humeralis Casey, 1895^{i c g b}
- Adaleres ovipennis Casey, 1895^{i c g b}

Data sources: i = ITIS, c = Catalogue of Life, g = GBIF, b = Bugguide.net
