= Anametis subfusca =

Scientific classification
- Domain: Eukaryota
- Kingdom: Animalia
- Phylum: Arthropoda
- Class: Insecta
- Order: Coleoptera
- Suborder: Polyphaga
- Infraorder: Cucujiformia
- Family: Curculionidae
- Genus: Anametis
- Species: A. subfusca

Binomial name
- Anametis subfusca Fall, 1907

Species of beetle

Anametis subfusca is a species of broad-nosed weevil in the beetle family Curculionidae. It is found in North America.
