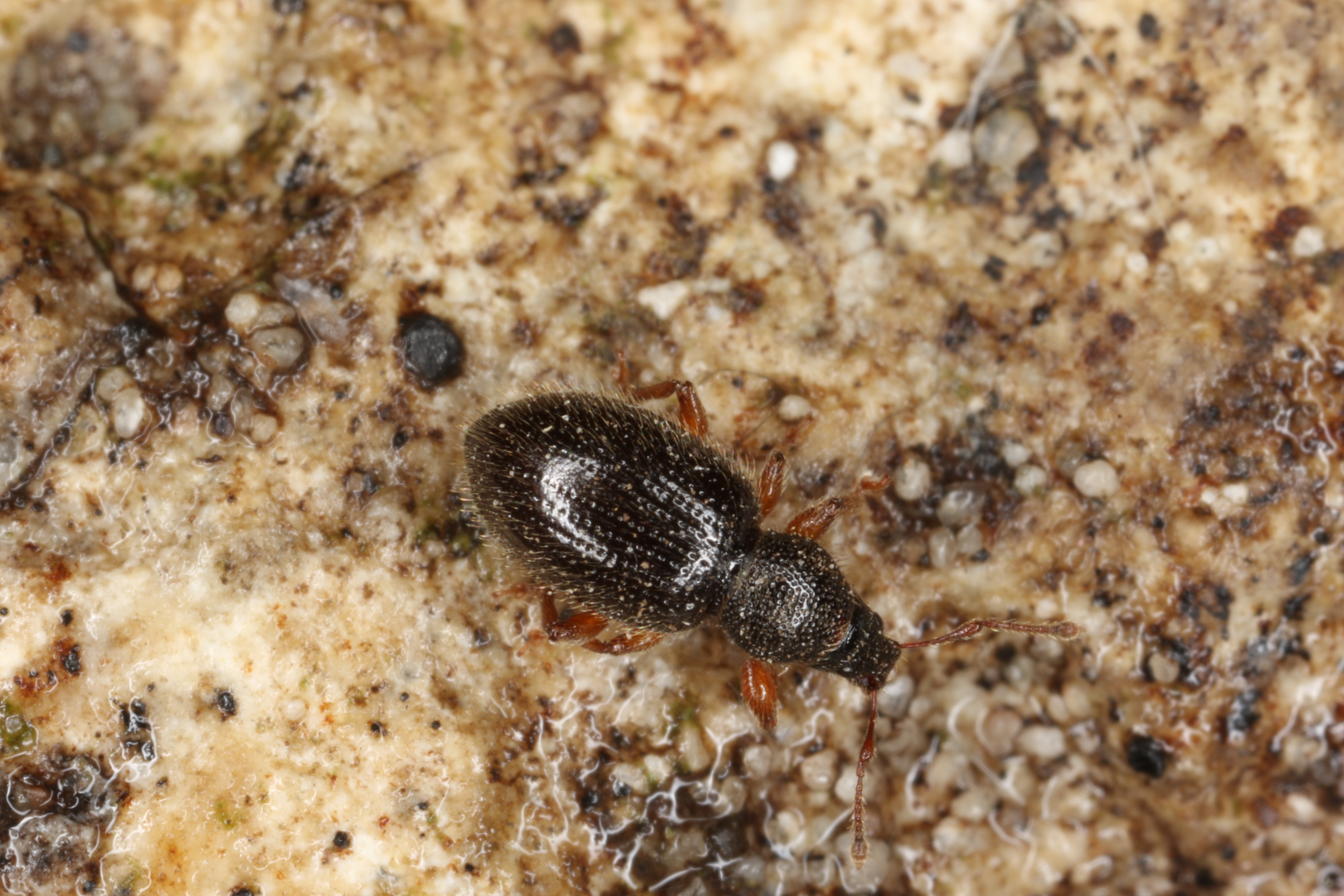

Scientific classification
- Kingdom: Animalia
- Phylum: Arthropoda
- Clade: Pancrustacea
- Class: Insecta
- Order: Coleoptera
- Suborder: Polyphaga
- Infraorder: Cucujiformia
- Superfamily: Curculionoidea
- Family: Curculionidae
- Genus: Barypeithes
- Species: B. pellucidus

Binomial name
- Barypeithes pellucidus (Boheman, 1834)

= Barypeithes pellucidus =

Species of beetle

Barypeithes pellucidus is a species of weevil native to Europe. It has been found in North American hardwood forests for over a century. Larva eat roots and overwinter underground.
