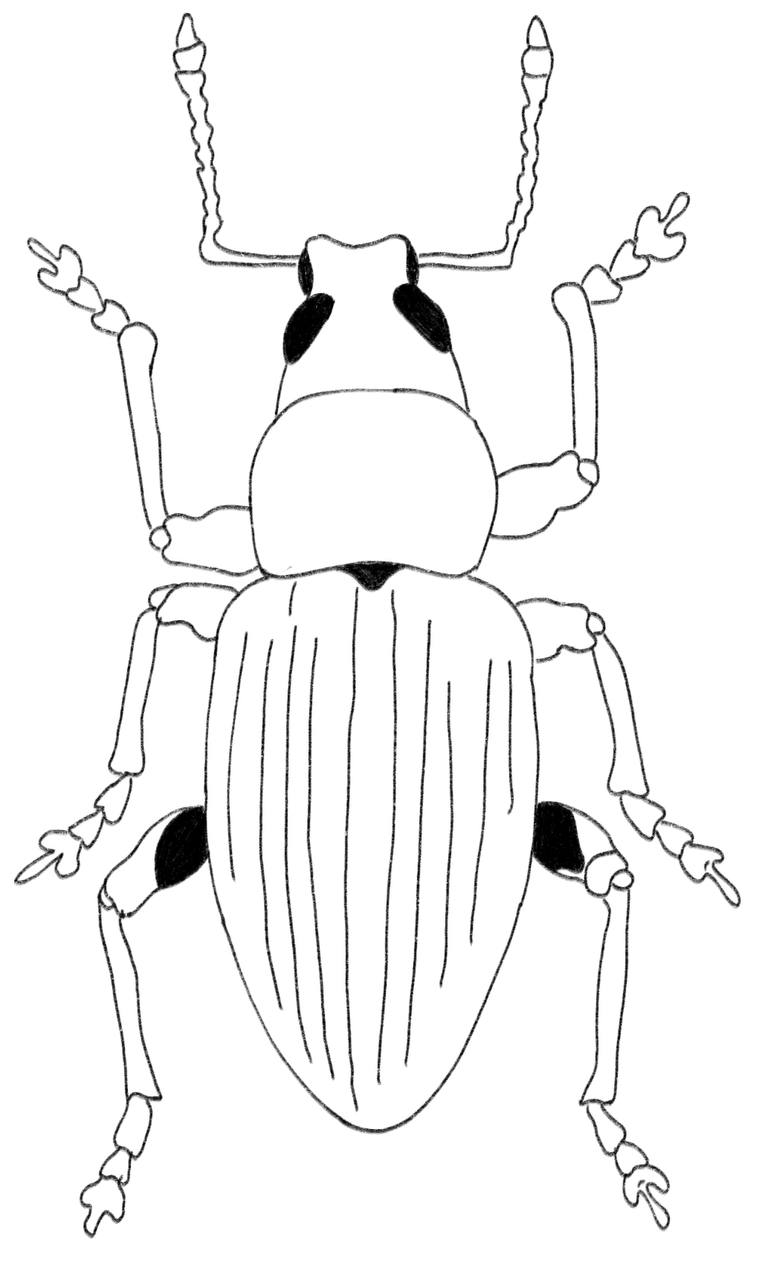

Scientific classification
- Kingdom: Animalia
- Phylum: Arthropoda
- Clade: Pancrustacea
- Class: Insecta
- Order: Coleoptera
- Suborder: Polyphaga
- Infraorder: Cucujiformia
- Superfamily: Curculionoidea
- Family: Curculionidae
- Genus: Sciaphobus
- Species: S. pelikani

Binomial name
- Sciaphobus pelikani (Borovec & Skuhrovec, 2015)
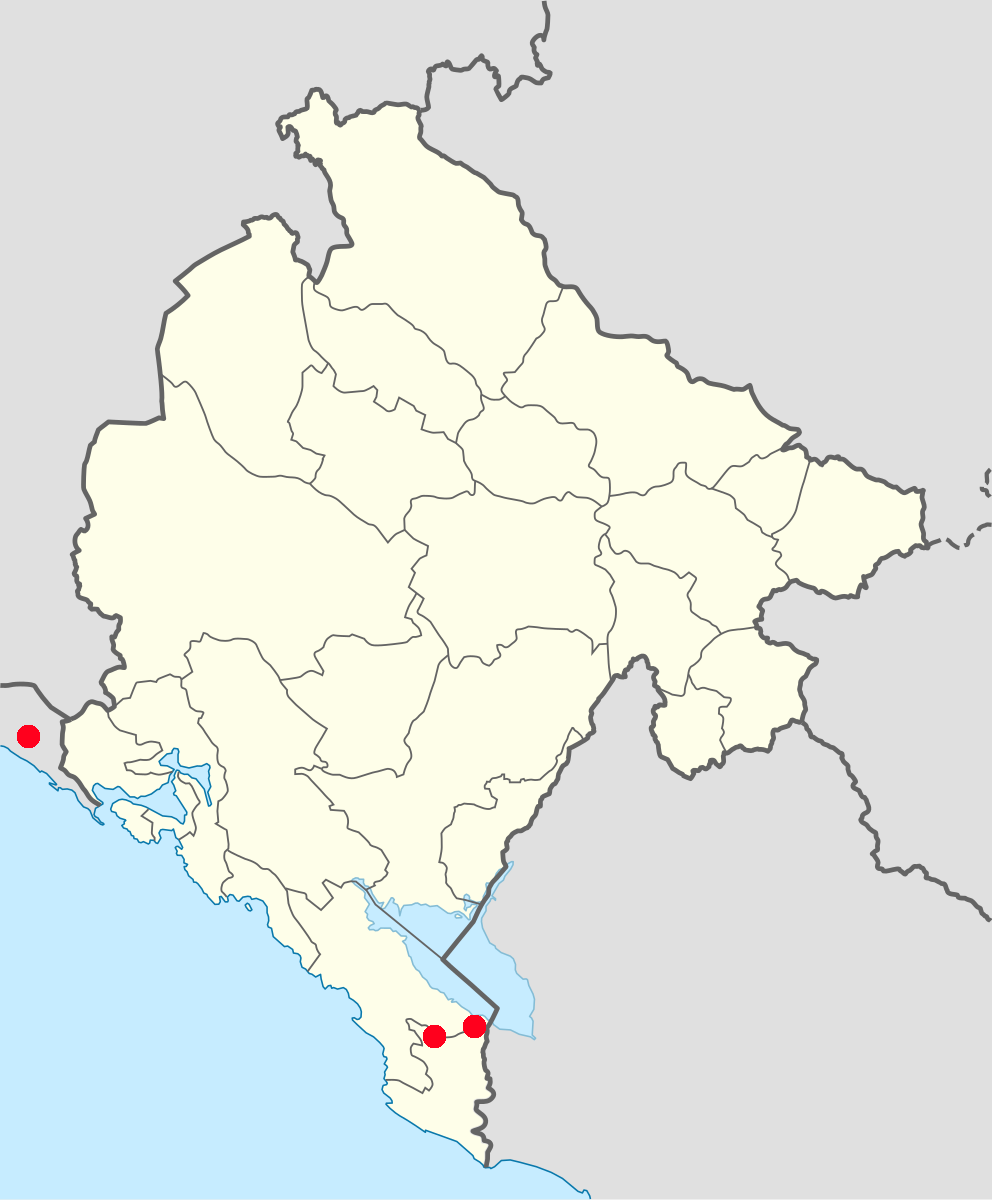

= Sciaphobus pelikani =

Species of weevil

Sciaphobus pelikani is a species of weevil native to Montenegro.

== Distribution ==
The species was initially described following the collection of its holotype in the Ulcinj municipality of Montenegro in 2015. At that time, Sciaphobus pelikani was considered endemic to the southern coastal region of Montenegro.This understanding was revised in 2020 when the species was recorded in the Konavle municipality of southern Croatia. It is now established that the range of S. pelikani encompasses the southeasternmost part of Croatia and the southern coastal municipalities of Montenegro. S. pelikani habitat is characterized by limestone rocky terrain and the edges of oak forests, where it is typically found by sweeping low vegetation in these areas.
