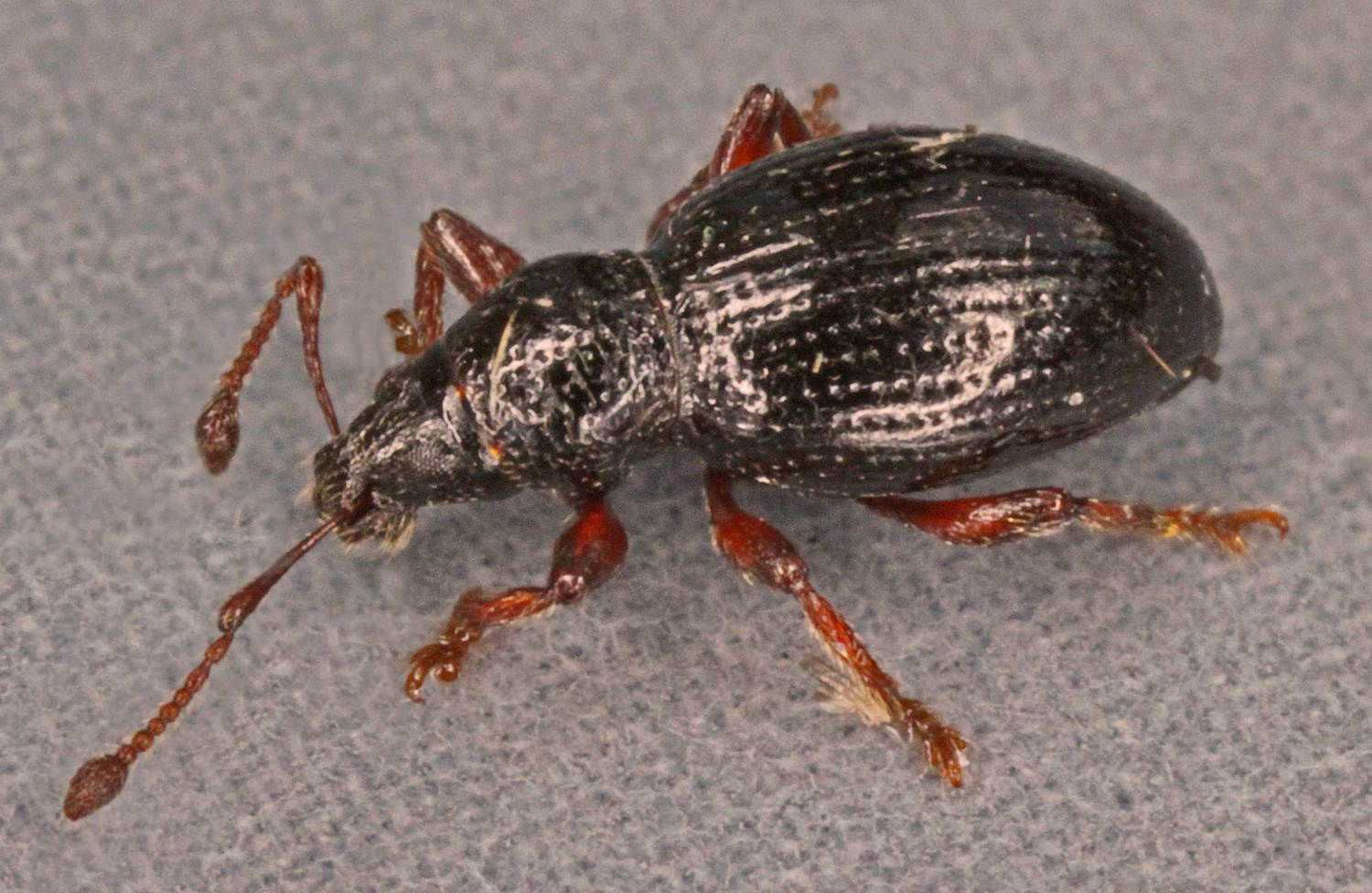
- Barypeithes araneiformis Trawscoed, North Wales

Scientific classification
- Kingdom: Animalia
- Phylum: Arthropoda
- Clade: Pancrustacea
- Class: Insecta
- Order: Coleoptera
- Suborder: Polyphaga
- Infraorder: Cucujiformia
- Superfamily: Curculionoidea
- Family: Curculionidae
- Genus: Barypeithes
- Species: B. araneiformis

Binomial name
- Barypeithes araneiformis (Schrank, 1781)

= Barypeithes araneiformis =

Species of beetle

Barypeithes araneiformis is a species of weevil native to Europe.
