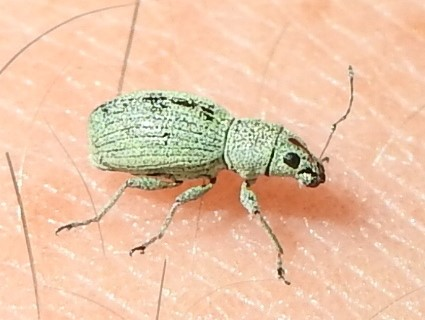

Scientific classification
- Kingdom: Animalia
- Phylum: Arthropoda
- Clade: Pancrustacea
- Class: Insecta
- Order: Coleoptera
- Suborder: Polyphaga
- Infraorder: Cucujiformia
- Superfamily: Curculionoidea
- Family: Curculionidae
- Genus: Mitostylus
- Species: M. tenuis

Binomial name
- Mitostylus tenuis Horn, 1876

= Mitostylus tenuis =

Species of beetle

Mitostylus tenuis, the broomweed broad-nosed weevil, is a species of broad-nosed weevil in the beetle family Curculionidae. It is found in North America.
