= Peritaxia =

Scientific classification
- Kingdom: Animalia
- Phylum: Arthropoda
- Class: Insecta
- Order: Coleoptera
- Suborder: Polyphaga
- Infraorder: Cucujiformia
- Family: Curculionidae
- Tribe: Tropiphorini
- Genus: Peritaxia; Horn, 1876

Genus of beetles

Peritaxia is a genus of broad-nosed weevils in the beetle family Curculionidae. There are about seven described species in Peritaxia.

== Species ==
These seven species belong to the genus Peritaxia:

- Peritaxia brevipilis Van Dyke, 1935^{i c g}
- Peritaxia elongata Pierce, 1913^{i c g}
- Peritaxia hispida Horn, 1876^{i c g b}
- Peritaxia longipennis Van Dyke, 1951^{i c g}
- Peritaxia perforata Casey, 1888^{i c g}
- Peritaxia rugicollis Horn, 1876^{i c g}
- Peritaxia uniformis (Van Dyke, 1936)^{i c g}

Data sources: i = ITIS, c = Catalogue of Life, g = GBIF, b = Bugguide.net
