= Cimbocera =

Scientific classification
- Domain: Eukaryota
- Kingdom: Animalia
- Phylum: Arthropoda
- Class: Insecta
- Order: Coleoptera
- Suborder: Polyphaga
- Infraorder: Cucujiformia
- Family: Curculionidae
- Tribe: Tropiphorini
- Genus: Cimbocera; Horn, 1876

Genus of beetles

Cimbocera is a genus of broad-nosed weevils in the beetle family Curculionidae. There are about five described species in Cimbocera.

== Species ==
These five species belong to the genus Cimbocera:

- Cimbocera buchanani Ting, 1940^{i c g}
- Cimbocera conspersa Fall, 1907^{i c g}
- Cimbocera pauper Horn, 1876^{i c g b}
- Cimbocera petersoni Tanner, 1941^{i c g}
- Cimbocera pilosa (Sharp, 1891)^{c g}

Data sources: i = ITIS, c = Catalogue of Life, g = GBIF, b = Bugguide.net
