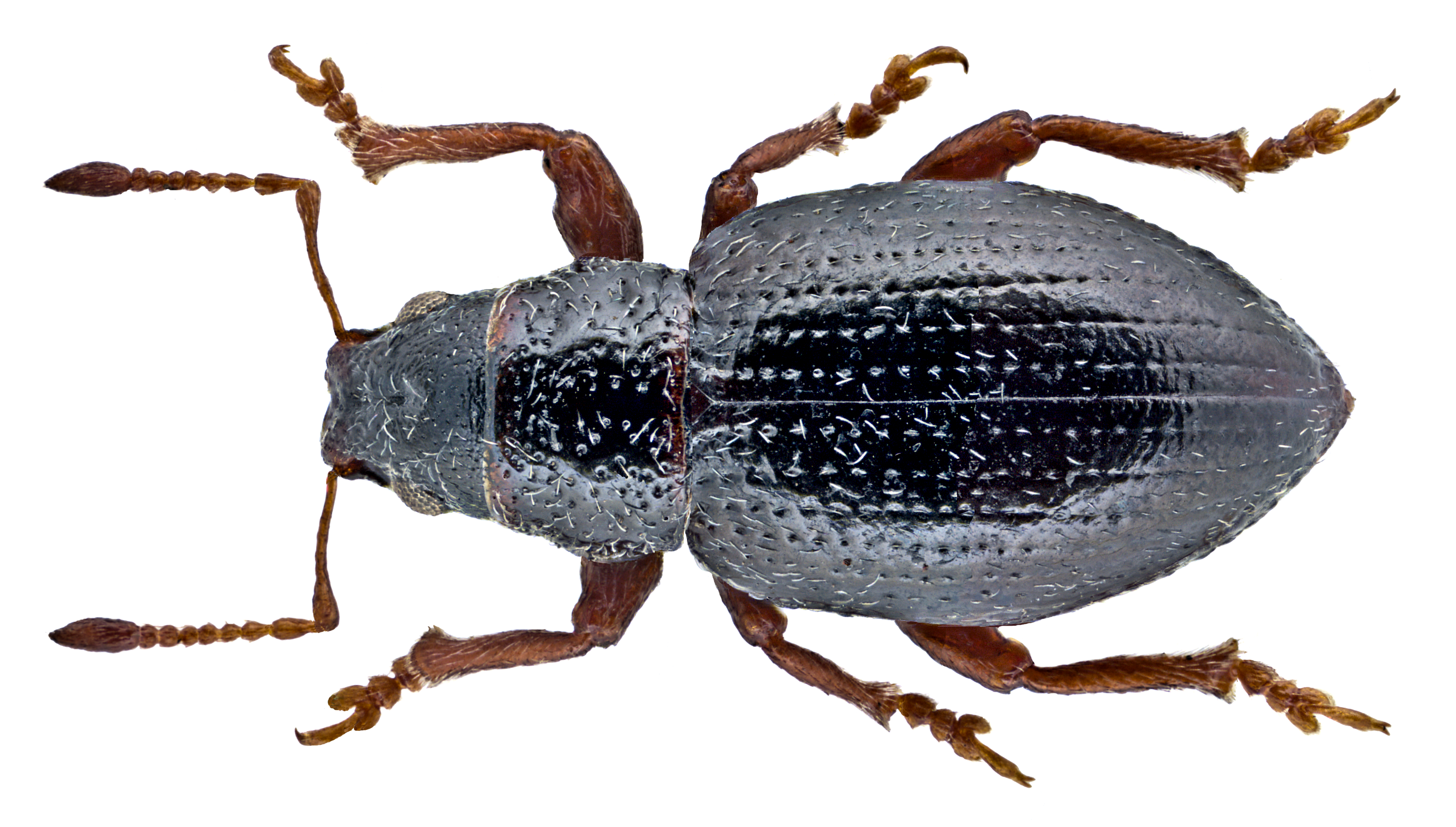
- Barypeithes sulcifrons 3,2 mm

Scientific classification
- Kingdom: Animalia
- Phylum: Arthropoda
- Clade: Pancrustacea
- Class: Insecta
- Order: Coleoptera
- Suborder: Polyphaga
- Infraorder: Cucujiformia
- Superfamily: Curculionoidea
- Family: Curculionidae
- Genus: Barypeithes
- Species: B. sulcifrons

Binomial name
- Barypeithes sulcifrons (Boheman, 1843)

= Barypeithes sulcifrons =

Species of beetle

Barypeithes sulcifrons is a species of weevil native to Europe.
