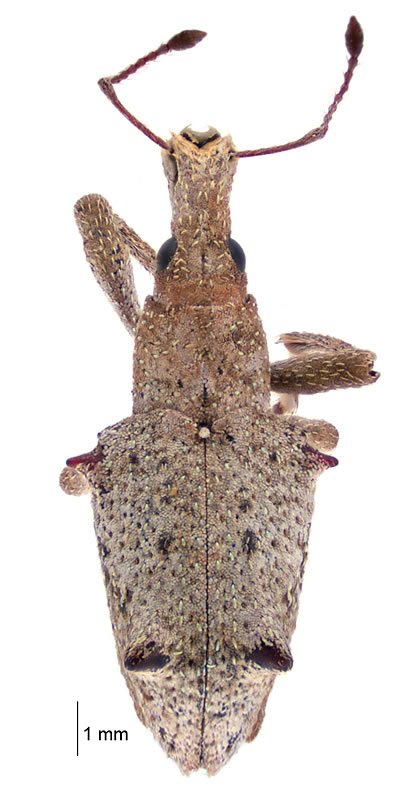
- Eurynotia hochstetteri

Scientific classification
- Kingdom: Animalia
- Phylum: Arthropoda
- Class: Insecta
- Order: Coleoptera
- Suborder: Polyphaga
- Infraorder: Cucujiformia
- Family: Curculionidae
- Tribe: Tropiphorini
- Genus: Eurynotia; Broun, 1880

Species
- Eurynotia enysi; Eurynotia hochstetteri

= Eurynotia =

Genus of beetles

Eurynotia is a weevil genus in the tribe Tropiphorini.
