= Adaleres humeralis =

Scientific classification
- Kingdom: Animalia
- Phylum: Arthropoda
- Class: Insecta
- Order: Coleoptera
- Suborder: Polyphaga
- Infraorder: Cucujiformia
- Family: Curculionidae
- Genus: Adaleres
- Species: A. humeralis

Binomial name
- Adaleres humeralis Casey, 1895

Species of weevil beetle

Adaleres humeralis is a species of broad-nosed weevil in the beetle family Curculionidae. It is found in North America.
