= Cimbocera pauper =

Scientific classification
- Domain: Eukaryota
- Kingdom: Animalia
- Phylum: Arthropoda
- Class: Insecta
- Order: Coleoptera
- Suborder: Polyphaga
- Infraorder: Cucujiformia
- Family: Curculionidae
- Genus: Cimbocera
- Species: C. pauper

Binomial name
- Cimbocera pauper Horn, 1876

Species of beetle

Cimbocera pauper is a species of broad-nosed weevil in the beetle family Curculionidae. It is found in North America.
