= Paranametis =

Scientific classification
- Kingdom: Animalia
- Phylum: Arthropoda
- Class: Insecta
- Order: Coleoptera
- Suborder: Polyphaga
- Infraorder: Cucujiformia
- Family: Curculionidae
- Tribe: Tropiphorini
- Genus: Paranametis; Burke, 1960

Genus of beetles

Paranametis is a genus of broad-nosed weevils in the beetle family Curculionidae. There is at least one described species in Paranametis, P. distincta.
