= Peritaxia hispida =

Scientific classification
- Domain: Eukaryota
- Kingdom: Animalia
- Phylum: Arthropoda
- Class: Insecta
- Order: Coleoptera
- Suborder: Polyphaga
- Infraorder: Cucujiformia
- Family: Curculionidae
- Genus: Peritaxia
- Species: P. hispida

Binomial name
- Peritaxia hispida Horn, 1876

Species of beetle

Peritaxia hispida is a species of broad-nosed weevil in the beetle family Curculionidae. It is found in North America.

The species was first described in 1876 by George H. Horn in Leconte's The Rhynchoptera of America, North of Mexico.
