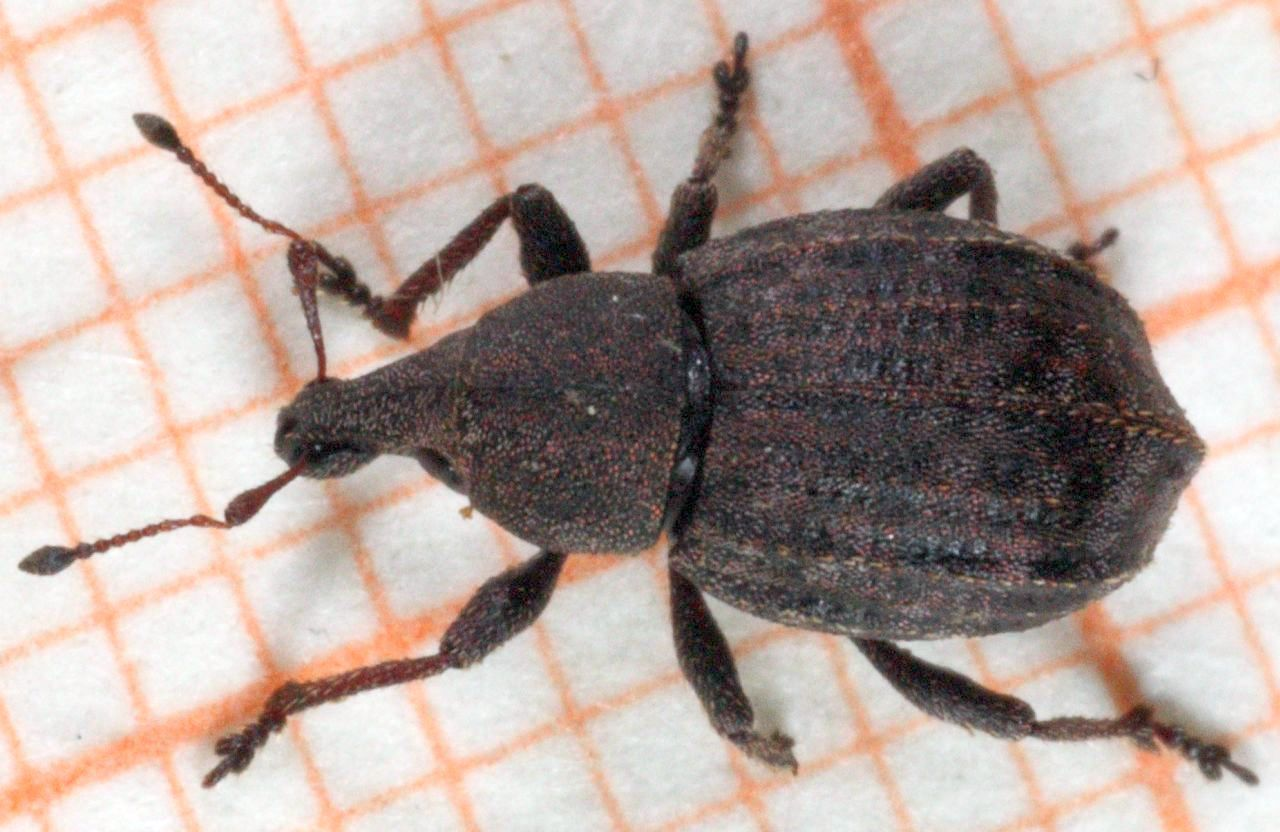

Scientific classification
- Kingdom: Animalia
- Phylum: Arthropoda
- Clade: Pancrustacea
- Class: Insecta
- Order: Coleoptera
- Suborder: Polyphaga
- Infraorder: Cucujiformia
- Superfamily: Curculionoidea
- Family: Curculionidae
- Genus: Tropiphorus
- Species: T. elevatus

Binomial name
- Tropiphorus elevatus Kraatz, G., 1882

= Tropiphorus elevatus =

Species of beetle

Tropiphorus elevatus is a species of broad-nosed weevil in the beetle family Curculionidae.
