= Mitostylus =

Scientific classification
- Domain: Eukaryota
- Kingdom: Animalia
- Phylum: Arthropoda
- Class: Insecta
- Order: Coleoptera
- Suborder: Polyphaga
- Infraorder: Cucujiformia
- Family: Curculionidae
- Tribe: Sciaphilini
- Genus: Mitostylus; Horn, 1876

Genus of beetles

Mitostylus is a genus of broad-nosed weevils in the beetle family Curculionidae. There are about seven described species in Mitostylus.

== Species ==
These seven species belong to the genus Mitostylus:

- Mitostylus elongatus Van Dyke, 1936^{i g b}
- Mitostylus fragilis Sharp, 1891^{c g}
- Mitostylus glaucus Champion, 1911^{c g}
- Mitostylus gracilis Horn, 1894^{c g}
- Mitostylus scutellaris Sharp, 1911^{c g}
- Mitostylus setosus (Sharp, 1891)^{i c g b}
- Mitostylus tenuis Horn, 1876^{i c g b} (broomweed broad-nosed weevil)

Data sources: i = ITIS, c = Catalogue of Life, g = GBIF, b = Bugguide.net
