= Anametis =

Scientific classification
- Domain: Eukaryota
- Kingdom: Animalia
- Phylum: Arthropoda
- Class: Insecta
- Order: Coleoptera
- Suborder: Polyphaga
- Infraorder: Cucujiformia
- Family: Curculionidae
- Tribe: Tropiphorini
- Genus: Anametis; Horn, 1876

Genus of beetles

Anametis is a genus of broad-nosed weevils in the beetle family Curculionidae. There are at least two described species in Anametis.

== Species ==
These two species belong to the genus Anametis:

- Anametis granulata (Say, 1831)^{i c g b}
- Anametis subfusca Fall, 1907^{i c g b}

Data sources: i = ITIS, c = Catalogue of Life, g = GBIF, b = Bugguide.net
