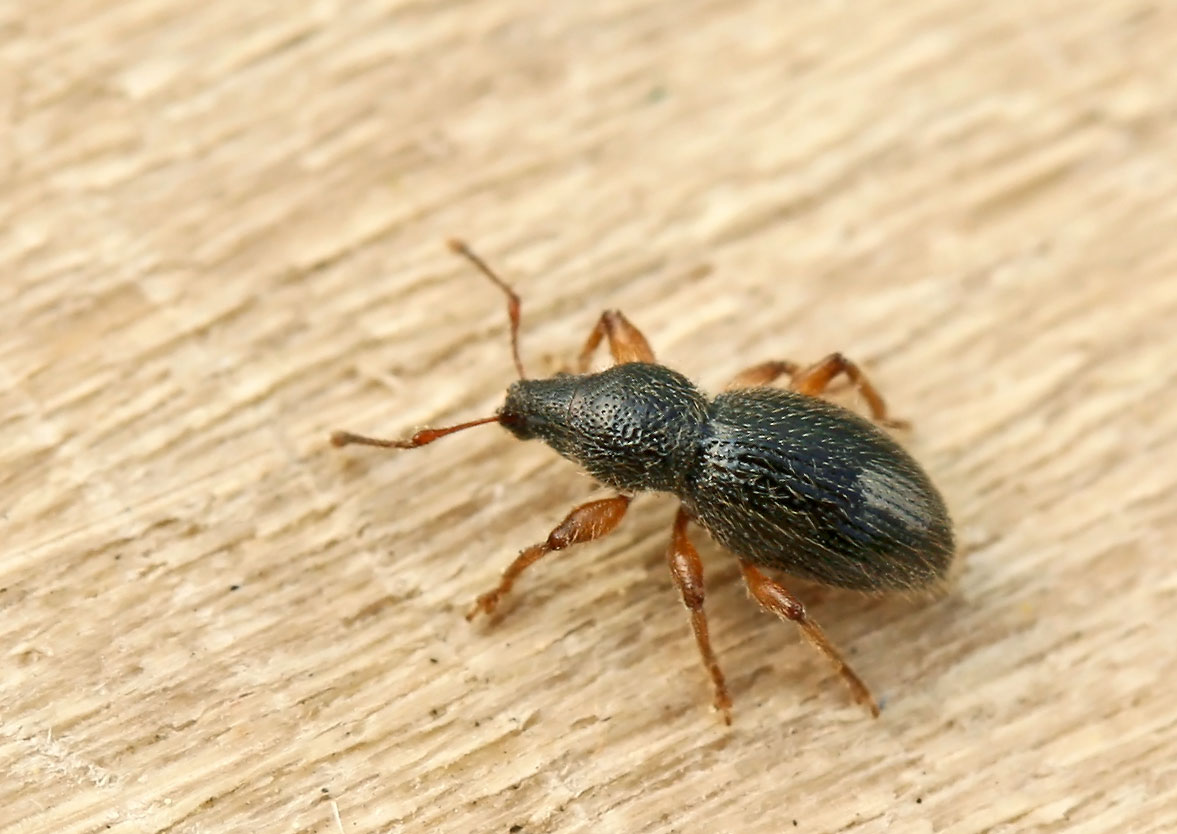
- Barypeithes pellucidus

Scientific classification
- Domain: Eukaryota
- Kingdom: Animalia
- Phylum: Arthropoda
- Class: Insecta
- Order: Coleoptera
- Suborder: Polyphaga
- Infraorder: Cucujiformia
- Family: Curculionidae
- Subfamily: Entiminae
- Tribe: Sciaphilini
- Genus: Barypeithes; Jacquelin du Val, 1854

= Barypeithes =

Genus of beetles

Barypeithes is a genus of beetles belonging to the family Curculionidae.

The genus was first described by Jacquelin du Val in 1854.

The species of this genus are found in Europe.

Species:

- Barypeithes araneiformis
- Barypeithes mollicomus
- Barypeithes pellucidus
- Barypeithes sulcifrons
- Barypeithes trichopterus
