= Rhigopsis effracta =

Scientific classification
- Kingdom: Animalia
- Phylum: Arthropoda
- Class: Insecta
- Order: Coleoptera
- Suborder: Polyphaga
- Infraorder: Cucujiformia
- Family: Curculionidae
- Genus: Rhigopsis
- Species: R. effracta

Binomial name
- Rhigopsis effracta LeConte, 1874

Synonyms
- Rhigopsis scutellata Casey, 1888

Species of beetle

Rhigopsis effracta is a species of broad-nosed weevil in the beetle family Curculionidae. It is found in North America.
