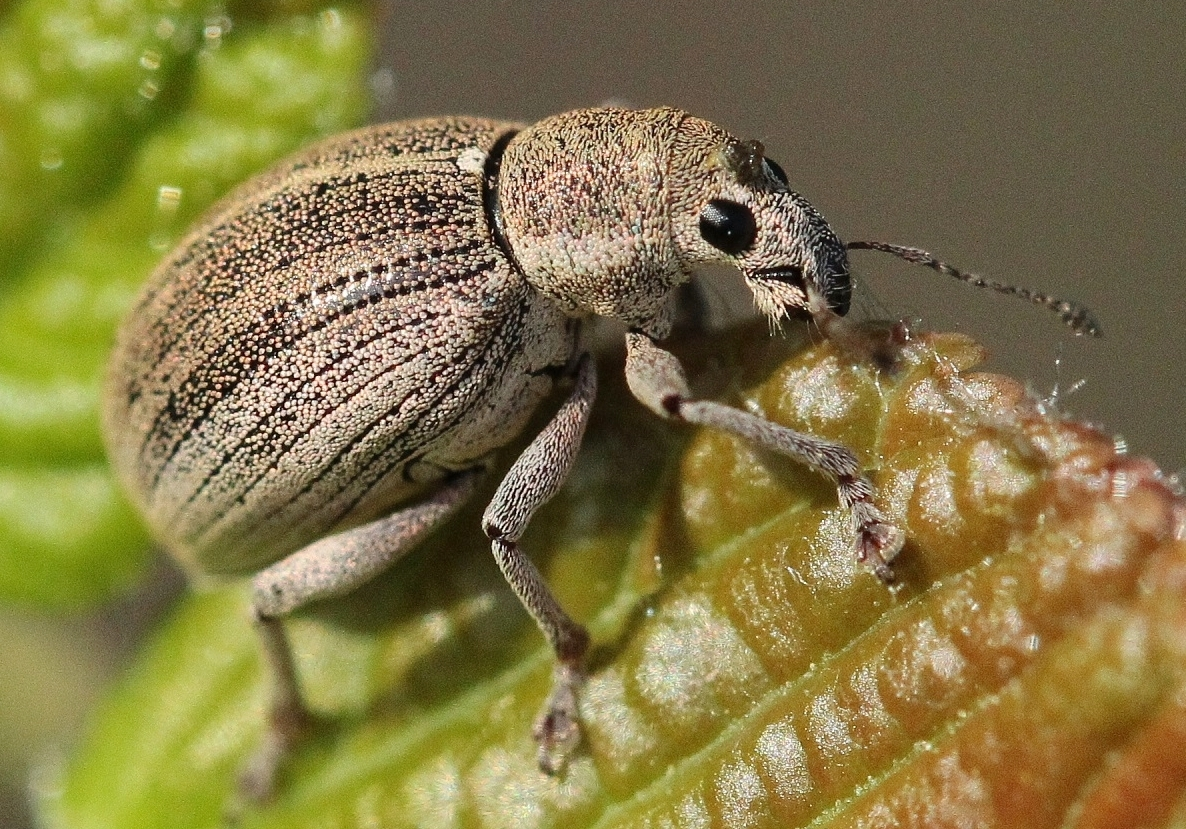
- Sciaphobus squalidus in Volgograd, Russia

Scientific classification
- Kingdom: Animalia
- Phylum: Arthropoda
- Clade: Pancrustacea
- Class: Insecta
- Order: Coleoptera
- Suborder: Polyphaga
- Infraorder: Cucujiformia
- Superfamily: Curculionoidea
- Family: Curculionidae
- Subfamily: Entiminae
- Tribe: Sciaphilini
- Genus: Sciaphobus; K. Daniel, 1904

= Sciaphobus =

Genus of beetles

Sciaphobus is a genus of beetles in the family Curculionidae, the true weevils.

== Description ==
The shoulders of the elytra are weakly defined. The elytra are strongly convex at the rear and lack erect bristles.

== Ecology ==
The larvae develop in the soil. Adult beetles are pests, primarily of fruit trees and shrubs.

== Species ==
Some species within the genus:

- Sciaphobus abbreviatus
- Sciaphobus albanicus
- Sciaphobus angustus
- Sciaphobus balcanicus
- Sciaphobus barbatulus
- Sciaphobus caesius
- Sciaphobus corpulentus
- Sciaphobus curvimanus
- Sciaphobus dorsualis
- Sciaphobus formaneki
- Sciaphobus globipennis
- Sciaphobus heteromorphus
- Sciaphobus megalopsis
- Sciaphobus messutati
- Sciaphobus muelleri
- Sciaphobus ningnidus
- Sciaphobus paliuri
- Sciaphobus pelikani
- Sciaphobus polydrosinus
- Sciaphobus rasus
- Sciaphobus reitteri
- Sciaphobus scheibeli
- Sciaphobus scitulus
- Sciaphobus setosulus
- Sciaphobus smaragdinus
- Sciaphobus squalidus
- Sciaphobus subnudus
- Sciaphobus vittatus
