= Anametis granulata =

Scientific classification
- Domain: Eukaryota
- Kingdom: Animalia
- Phylum: Arthropoda
- Class: Insecta
- Order: Coleoptera
- Suborder: Polyphaga
- Infraorder: Cucujiformia
- Family: Curculionidae
- Genus: Anametis
- Species: A. granulata

Binomial name
- Anametis granulata (Say, 1831)

Synonyms
- Anametis grisea Horn, 1876

Species of beetle

Anametis granulata is a species of broad-nosed weevil in the beetle family Curculionidae. It is found in North America.
