= Sclerococcus =

Scientific classification
- Kingdom: Animalia
- Phylum: Arthropoda
- Class: Insecta
- Order: Coleoptera
- Suborder: Polyphaga
- Infraorder: Cucujiformia
- Family: Curculionidae
- Subfamily: Entiminae
- Tribe: Tropiphorini
- Genus: Sclerococcus; Schönherr, 1840
- Species: S. granulatus

Binomial name
- Sclerococcus granulatus Fåhraeus in Schönherr, 1840

Genus of beetles

Sclerococcus is a monotypic weevil genus in the tribe Tropiphorini. The only species is Sclerococcus granulatus.
