= Sciaphobus formaneki =

Scientific classification
- Kingdom: Animalia
- Phylum: Arthropoda
- Clade: Pancrustacea
- Class: Insecta
- Order: Coleoptera
- Suborder: Polyphaga
- Infraorder: Cucujiformia
- Superfamily: Curculionoidea
- Family: Curculionidae
- Genus: Sciaphobus
- Species: S. formaneki

Binomial name
- Sciaphobus formaneki Borovec & Skuhrovec, 2015
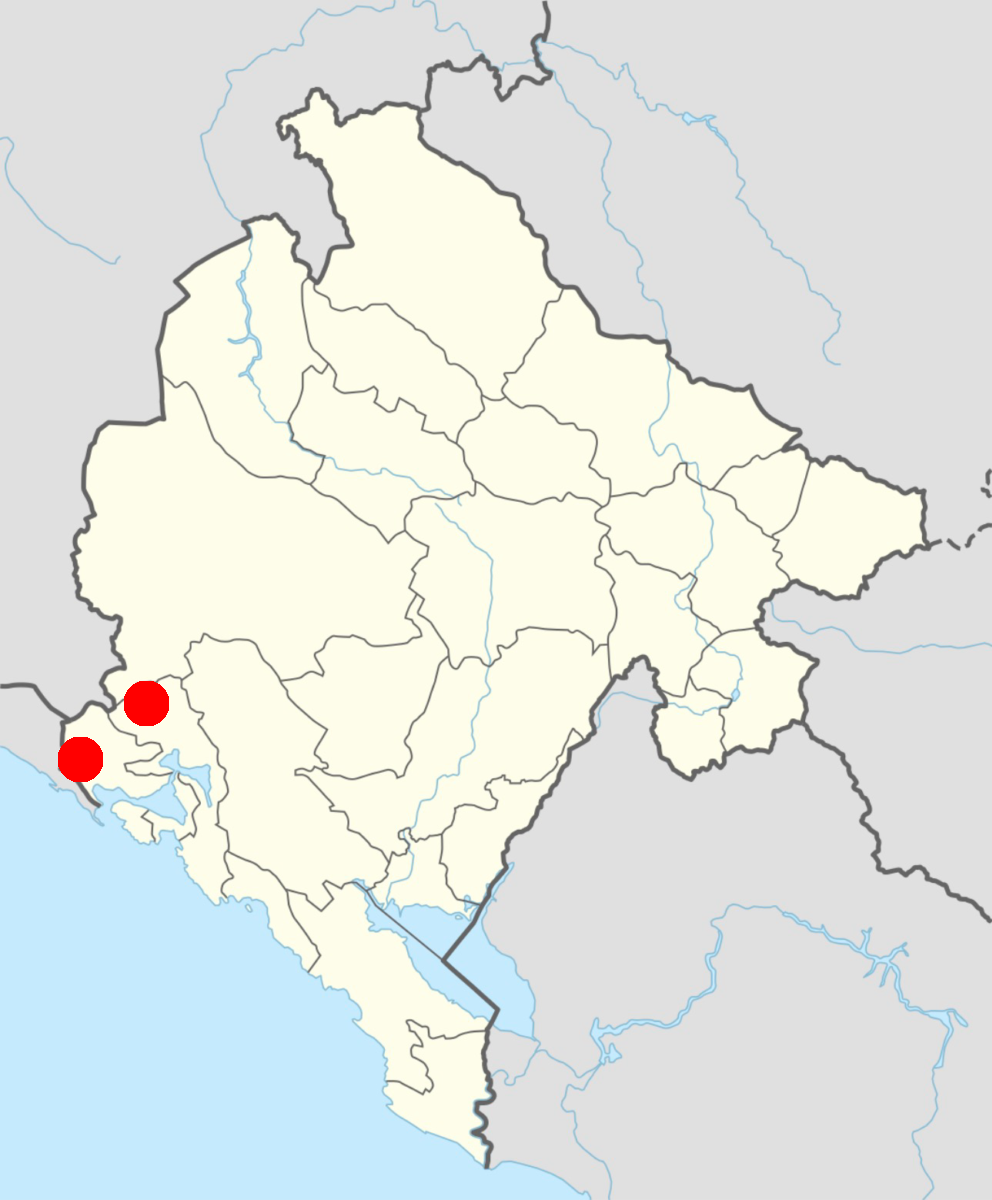

Species of weevil

Sciaphobus formaneki is a species of weevil native to Montenegro.

== Distribution ==
This species is endemic to eastern Montenegro. Its known range is restricted to the regions of Krivošije and Sutorina.
