= Von Bonsdorff =

Vons Bonsdorff is a surname. Notable people with this surname include:

- Edith von Bonsdorff (1890-1968), Danish-Finnish ballet dancer
- Hjalmar von Bonsdorff (1869-1945), Finnish admiral
- Max von Bonsdorff (1882 -1967), Finnish bishop

== See also ==
- Bonsdorff (surname)
