= Crocidema =

Scientific classification
- Domain: Eukaryota
- Kingdom: Animalia
- Phylum: Arthropoda
- Class: Insecta
- Order: Coleoptera
- Suborder: Polyphaga
- Infraorder: Cucujiformia
- Family: Curculionidae
- Tribe: Tropiphorini
- Genus: Crocidema; Van Dyke, 1934

Genus of beetles

Crocidema is a genus of broad-nosed weevils in the beetle family Curculionidae. There are about six described species in Crocidema.

== Species ==
These six species belong to the genus Crocidema:

- Crocidema arizonica Van Dyke, 1951^{i c g b}
- Crocidema attenuata Van Dyke, 1934^{i g}
- Crocidema attenullta Van Dyke, 1934^{c g}
- Crocidema californica Van Dyke, 1934^{i c g b}
- Crocidema nigrior Van Dyke, 1934^{i c g}
- Crocidema planifrons Van Dyke, 1934^{i c g}

Data sources: i = ITIS, c = Catalogue of Life, g = GBIF, b = Bugguide.net
