= Pseudorimus =

Scientific classification
- Domain: Eukaryota
- Kingdom: Animalia
- Phylum: Arthropoda
- Class: Insecta
- Order: Coleoptera
- Suborder: Polyphaga
- Infraorder: Cucujiformia
- Family: Curculionidae
- Tribe: Tropiphorini
- Genus: Pseudorimus; Van Dyke, 1934

Genus of beetles

Pseudorimus is a genus of broad-nosed weevils in the beetle family Curculionidae. There are at least two described species in Pseudorimus.

== Species ==
These two species belong to the genus Pseudorimus:

- Pseudorimus granicollis Van Dyke, 1934^{i c g}
- Pseudorimus orbicollis Van Dyke, 1934^{i c g b}

Data sources: i = ITIS, c = Catalogue of Life, g = GBIF, b = Bugguide.net
