= Panscopus abruptus =

Scientific classification
- Kingdom: Animalia
- Phylum: Arthropoda
- Class: Insecta
- Order: Coleoptera
- Suborder: Polyphaga
- Infraorder: Cucujiformia
- Superfamily: Curculionoidea
- Family: Curculionidae
- Genus: Panscopus
- Species: P. abruptus

Binomial name
- Panscopus abruptus (Casey, 1895)

Species of beetle

Panscopus abruptus is a species of broad-nosed weevils in the family Curculionidae. It is found in North America.
