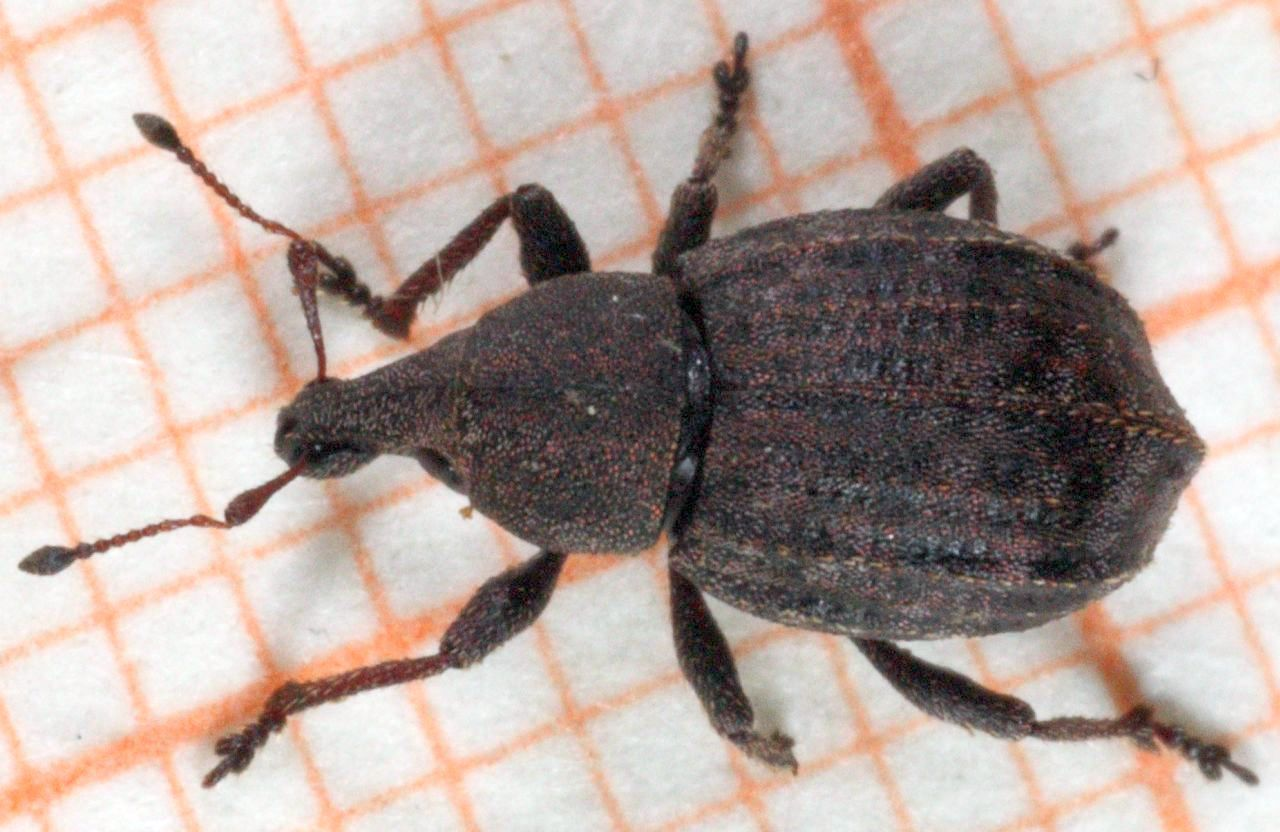
- Tropiphorus elevatus

Scientific classification
- Domain: Eukaryota
- Kingdom: Animalia
- Phylum: Arthropoda
- Class: Insecta
- Order: Coleoptera
- Suborder: Polyphaga
- Infraorder: Cucujiformia
- Family: Curculionidae
- Tribe: Tropiphorini
- Genus: Tropiphorus; Schönherr, 1842

= Tropiphorus =

Genus of beetles

Tropiphorus is a genus of broad-nosed weevils in the beetle family Curculionidae. There are about 18 described species in Tropiphorus.

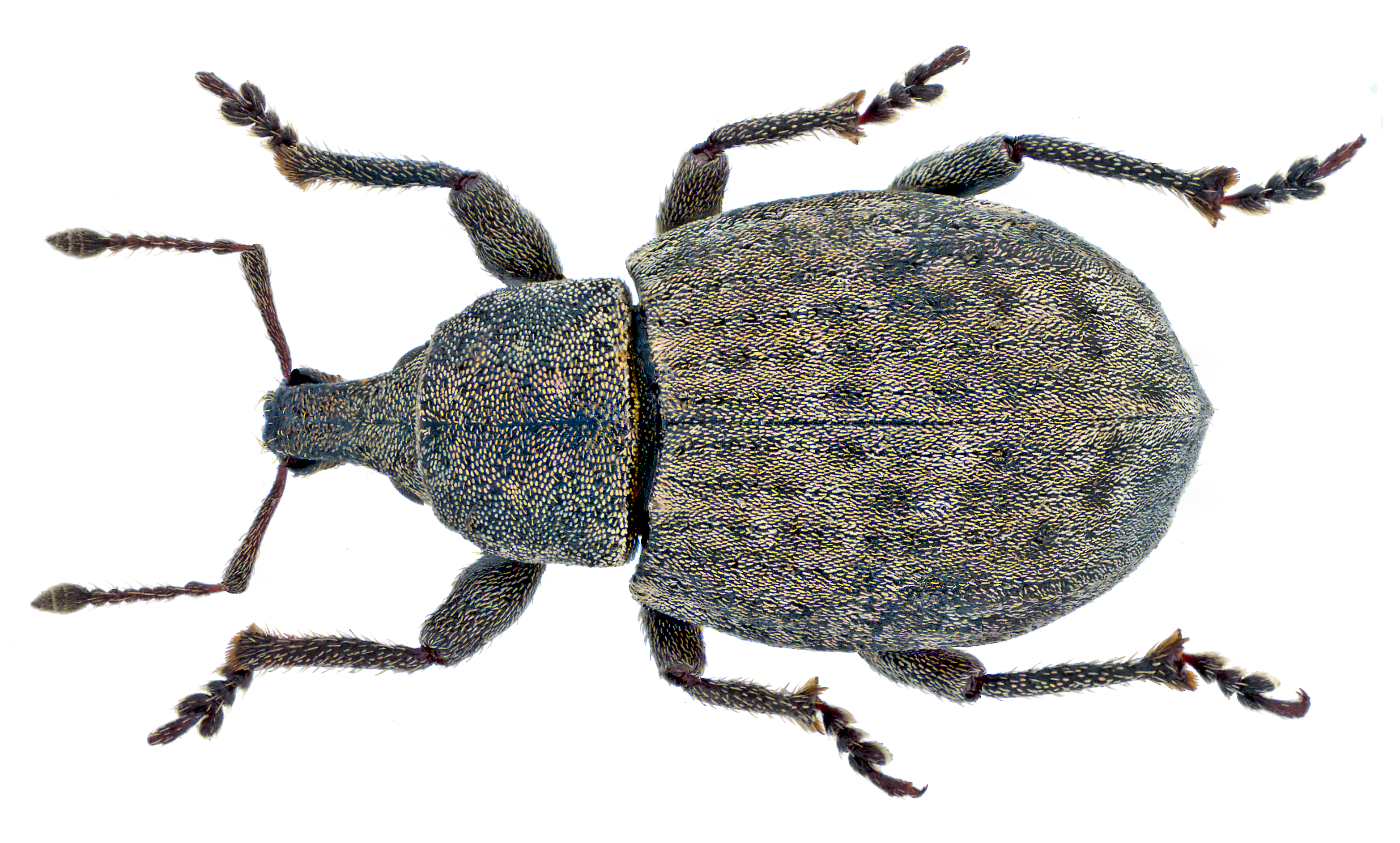
Tropiphorus terricola

== Species ==
These 18 species belong to the genus Tropiphorus:

- Tropiphorus albanicus Apfelbeck, 1928^{c g}
- Tropiphorus bertolinii Stierlin, 1894^{c g}
- Tropiphorus caesius (Frivaldszky, 1879)^{c g}
- Tropiphorus carinatus (Müller, 1776)^{i}
- Tropiphorus cucullatus Fauvel, 1888^{c g}
- Tropiphorus elevatus Kraatz, G., 1882^{c g b}
- Tropiphorus fiorii Pedroni, 2006^{c g}
- Tropiphorus imperator Pesarini, 1995^{c g}
- Tropiphorus micans Boheman, 1842^{c g}
- Tropiphorus moldavicus Penecke, 1924^{c g}
- Tropiphorus norici Yunakov, 2013^{c g}
- Tropiphorus obtusus (Bonsdorff, 1785)^{i c g b}
- Tropiphorus ochraceosignatus Boheman, 1842^{c g}
- Tropiphorus paulae Pedroni, 2012^{c g}
- Tropiphorus serbicus Reitter, 1901^{c g}
- Tropiphorus styriacus Bedel, 1885^{c g}
- Tropiphorus terricola (Newman, 1838)^{i c g b}
- Tropiphorus transsylvanicus Daniel K. et Daniel J., 1898^{c g}

Data sources: i = ITIS, c = Catalogue of Life, g = GBIF, b = Bugguide.net
