= Crocidema californica =

Scientific classification
- Domain: Eukaryota
- Kingdom: Animalia
- Phylum: Arthropoda
- Class: Insecta
- Order: Coleoptera
- Suborder: Polyphaga
- Infraorder: Cucujiformia
- Family: Curculionidae
- Genus: Crocidema
- Species: C. californica

Binomial name
- Crocidema californica Van Dyke, 1934

Species of beetle

Crocidema californica is a species of broad-nosed weevil in the beetle family Curculionidae. It is found in North America.
