= Dirotognathus sordidus =

Scientific classification
- Domain: Eukaryota
- Kingdom: Animalia
- Phylum: Arthropoda
- Class: Insecta
- Order: Coleoptera
- Suborder: Polyphaga
- Infraorder: Cucujiformia
- Family: Curculionidae
- Genus: Dirotognathus
- Species: D. sordidus

Binomial name
- Dirotognathus sordidus Horn, 1876

Species of beetle

Dirotognathus sordidus is a species of broad-nosed weevil in the beetle family Curculionidae. It is found in North America.
