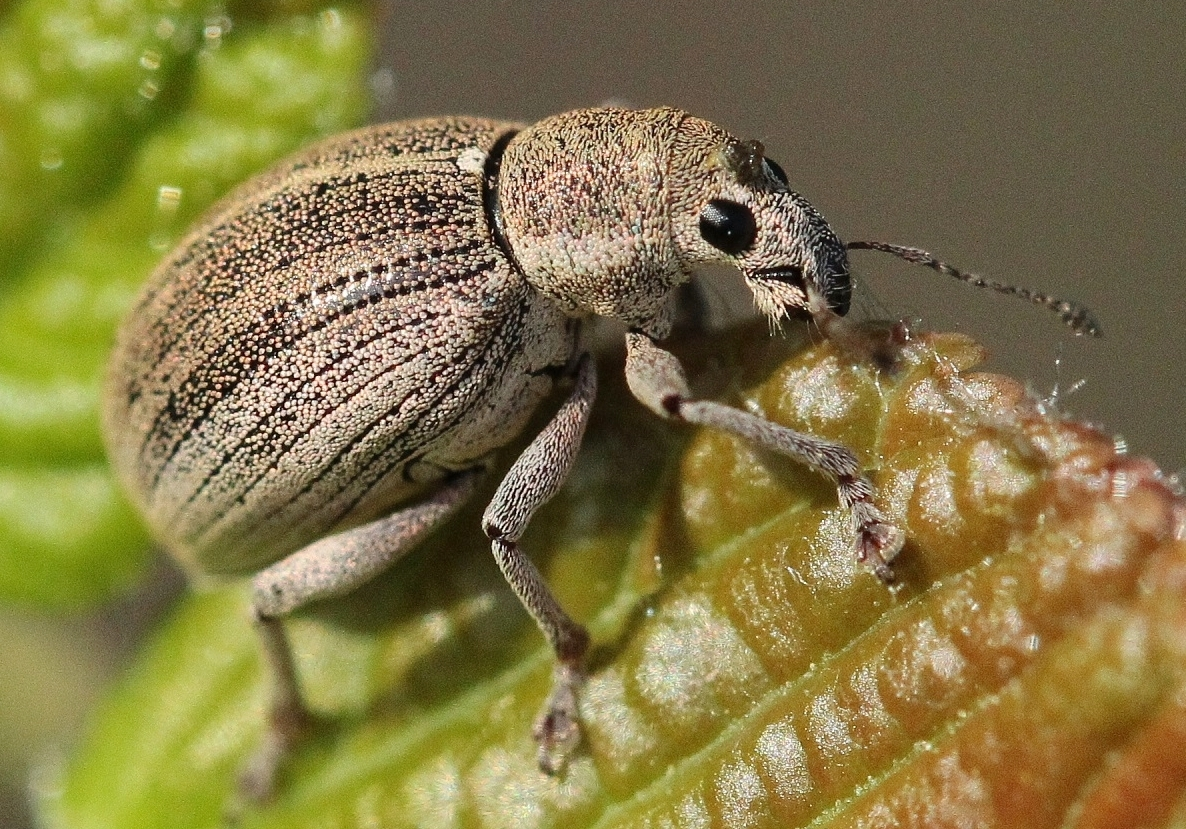

Scientific classification
- Kingdom: Animalia
- Phylum: Arthropoda
- Clade: Pancrustacea
- Class: Insecta
- Order: Coleoptera
- Suborder: Polyphaga
- Infraorder: Cucujiformia
- Superfamily: Curculionoidea
- Family: Curculionidae
- Genus: Sciaphobus
- Species: S. squalidus

Binomial name
- Sciaphobus squalidus (Gyllenhal, 1834)
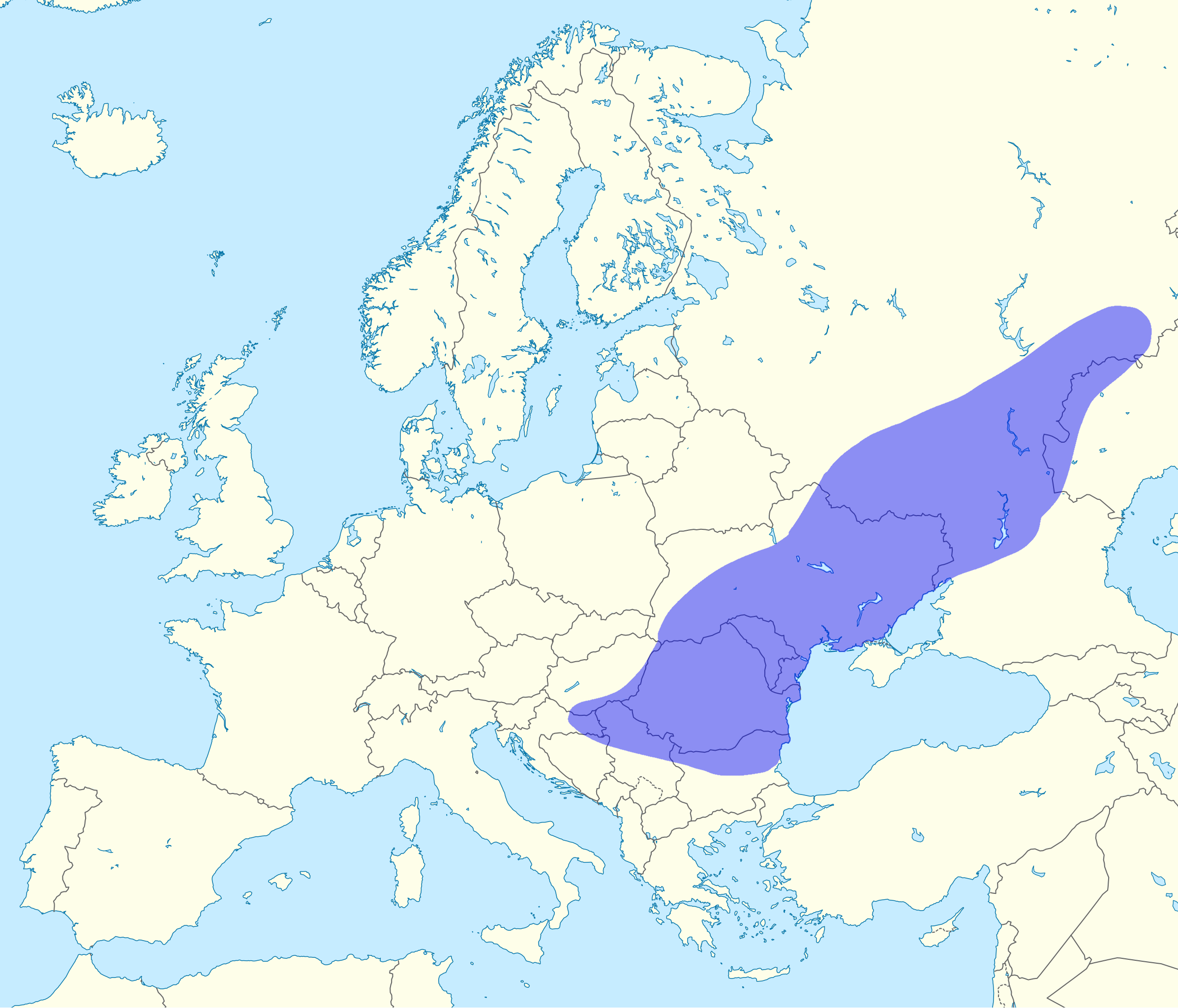

= Sciaphobus squalidus =

Species of weevil

Sciaphobus squalidus, also known as grey bud weevil, is a species of weevil native to Europe.

== Description ==
Sciaphobus squalidus is known to be harmful to fruit trees, as it attacks the buds of the plants and inhibits growth.

Sciaphobus squalidus has confirmed records from Russia, Ukraine, Moldova, Romania, Bulgaria, Serbia and Croatia, however its range is likely more diverse.
