= Dichoxenus setiger =

Scientific classification
- Domain: Eukaryota
- Kingdom: Animalia
- Phylum: Arthropoda
- Class: Insecta
- Order: Coleoptera
- Suborder: Polyphaga
- Infraorder: Cucujiformia
- Family: Curculionidae
- Genus: Dichoxenus
- Species: D. setiger

Binomial name
- Dichoxenus setiger Horn, 1876

Synonyms
- Dichoxenus arkansasensis Sleeper, 1956

Species of beetle

Dichoxenus setiger is a species of broad-nosed weevil in the beetle family Curculionidae. It is found in North America.

== Subspecies ==
These two subspecies belong to the species Dichoxenus setiger:

- Dichoxenus setiger arkansasensis Sleeper, 1956^{c g}
- Dichoxenus setiger setiger^{g}

Data sources: i = ITIS, c = Catalogue of Life, g = GBIF, b = Bugguide.net
