= Orimodema =

Scientific classification
- Kingdom: Animalia
- Phylum: Arthropoda
- Class: Insecta
- Order: Coleoptera
- Suborder: Polyphaga
- Infraorder: Cucujiformia
- Family: Curculionidae
- Tribe: Tropiphorini
- Genus: Orimodema; Horn, 1876

Genus of beetles

Orimodema is a genus of broad-nosed weevils in the beetle family Curculionidae. There is one described species in Orimodema, O. protracta.
