= Chiloneus =

Scientific classification
- Kingdom: Animalia
- Phylum: Arthropoda
- Class: Insecta
- Order: Coleoptera
- Suborder: Polyphaga
- Infraorder: Cucujiformia
- Family: Curculionidae
- Subfamily: Entiminae
- Tribe: Sciaphilini
- Genus: Chiloneus; Schoenherr, 1842

Species
- Many, including: Chiloneus elegans Weise in Reitt., 1906

Genus of beetles

Chiloneus is a genus of weevils in the tribe Sciaphilini.
