= Mitostylus setosus =

Scientific classification
- Kingdom: Animalia
- Phylum: Arthropoda
- Class: Insecta
- Order: Coleoptera
- Suborder: Polyphaga
- Infraorder: Cucujiformia
- Family: Curculionidae
- Genus: Mitostylus
- Species: M. setosus

Binomial name
- Mitostylus setosus (Sharp, 1891)

Species of beetle

Mitostylus setosus is a species of broad-nosed weevil in the beetle family Curculionidae. It is found in North America.
