= Panscopus ovalis =

Scientific classification
- Domain: Eukaryota
- Kingdom: Animalia
- Phylum: Arthropoda
- Class: Insecta
- Order: Coleoptera
- Suborder: Polyphaga
- Infraorder: Cucujiformia
- Family: Curculionidae
- Genus: Panscopus
- Species: P. ovalis

Binomial name
- Panscopus ovalis Pierce, 1913

Species of beetle

Panscopus ovalis is a species of broad-nosed weevil in the beetle family Curculionidae. It is found in North America.
