= Phyxelis =

Scientific classification
- Kingdom: Animalia
- Phylum: Arthropoda
- Class: Insecta
- Order: Coleoptera
- Suborder: Polyphaga
- Infraorder: Cucujiformia
- Family: Curculionidae
- Tribe: Tropiphorini
- Genus: Phyxelis; Schönherr, 1842

Genus of beetles

Phyxelis is a genus of broad-nosed weevils in the beetle family Curculionidae. There are at least two described species within the genus Phyxelis.

== Species ==
These two species belong to the genus Phyxelis:

- Phyxelis latirostris Blatchley, 1916^{i c g}
- Phyxelis rigidus (Say, 1831)^{i c g b}

Data sources: i = ITIS, c = Catalogue of Life, g = GBIF, b = Bugguide.net
