= Foucartia =

Scientific classification
- Kingdom: Animalia
- Phylum: Arthropoda
- Clade: Pancrustacea
- Class: Insecta
- Order: Coleoptera
- Suborder: Polyphaga
- Infraorder: Cucujiformia
- Superfamily: Curculionoidea
- Family: Curculionidae
- Tribe: Sciaphilini
- Genus: Foucartia; Jacquelin du Val, 1854

Synonyms
- Parafoucartia F. Solari, 1948

Genus of beetles

Foucartia is a genus of broad-nosed weevils in the beetle family Curculionidae. There are several described species in Foucartia. Amongst these, Foucartia squamulata is a widespread Eurasian species.

== Species ==
These species belong to the genus Foucartia:

- Foucartia behnei Borovec & Pelletier, 2010^{c g}
- Foucartia chloris Kiesenwetter, 1864^{c g}
- Foucartia cremieri Jacquelin du Val, 1854^{c g}
- Foucartia dieckmanni Angelov, 1986^{c g}
- Foucartia elegans Kraatz, 1859^{c g}
- Foucartia elongata Tournier, 1876^{c g}
- Foucartia helenae Borovec & Pelletier, 2010^{c g}
- Foucartia lepidota (Perris, 1866)^{c g}
- Foucartia lethierryi Desbrochers des Loges, 1875^{c g}
- Foucartia podlussanyi Borovec & Pelletier, 2010^{c g}
- Foucartia ptochioides (Bach, 1856)^{c g} (See comment below)
- Foucartia reitteri (Formánek, 1908)^{c g}
- Foucartia sacarensis Angelov, 1987^{c g}
- Foucartia squamulata (Herbst, 1795)^{c g}

Data sources: c = Catalogue of Life, g = GBIF,

(Note: Foucartia liturata^{g} can be instead under Brachysomus lituratus)

(Note for Foucartia ptochioides the original spelling of the epithet in Bach, 1856 is "ptochioides" (on p.244 and appendix p.405) as "Sciaphilus ptochioides" Bach, 1856, contra later spelling as "ptochoides").
