= Phyxelis rigidus =

Scientific classification
- Domain: Eukaryota
- Kingdom: Animalia
- Phylum: Arthropoda
- Class: Insecta
- Order: Coleoptera
- Suborder: Polyphaga
- Infraorder: Cucujiformia
- Family: Curculionidae
- Genus: Phyxelis
- Species: P. rigidus

Binomial name
- Phyxelis rigidus (Say, 1831)

Synonyms
- Phyxelis glomerosus Boheman, 1843; Phyxelis setiferus Boheman, 1843; Trachyphloeus melanothrix Kirby, 1837

Species of beetle

Phyxelis rigidus is a species of broad-nosed weevil in the beetle family Curculionidae. It is found in North America.
