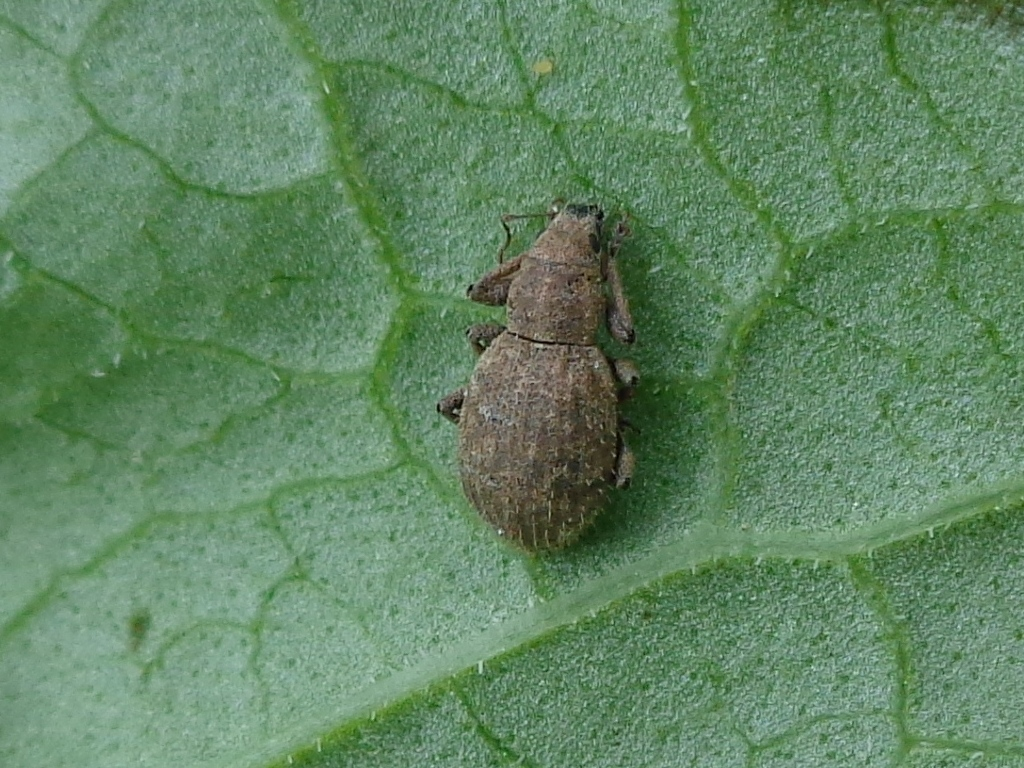
- Sciaphilus asperatus

Scientific classification
- Kingdom: Animalia
- Phylum: Arthropoda
- Clade: Pancrustacea
- Class: Insecta
- Order: Coleoptera
- Suborder: Polyphaga
- Infraorder: Cucujiformia
- Superfamily: Curculionoidea
- Family: Curculionidae
- Subfamily: Entiminae
- Tribe: Sciaphilini; Sharp, 1891

Genera
- See text

= Sciaphilini =

Tribe of beetles

Sciaphilini is a weevil tribe in the subfamily Entiminae.

== Genera ==
Abarypeithes – Alocyrtus – Ameladus – Amicromias – Archeophloeus – Balchaschia – Barypeithes – Brachysomus – Chaetopantus – Chilodrosus – Chiloneus – Chilonorrhinus – Chionostagon – Cyclomias – Cyrtops – Dinas – Dinosius – Edmundia – Euidosomus – Eusomatus – Eusomomorphus – Eusomus – Foucartia – Hypsomias – Mitostylus – Mylacomorphus – Mylochlamys – Ochnodes – Omiocratus – Paophilus – Pareusomus – Platycopes – Pleurodirus – Plochomorphus – Pseudoptochus – Sauromates – Sciaphilomorphus – Sciaphilus – Sciaphobus – Sciomias – Sericopholus – Stasiodis – Svnaptorhinus – Synechops – Tapinomorphus – Tylauchen – Wittmerella – †Archaeosciaphilus
