= Dirotognathus =

Scientific classification
- Domain: Eukaryota
- Kingdom: Animalia
- Phylum: Arthropoda
- Class: Insecta
- Order: Coleoptera
- Suborder: Polyphaga
- Infraorder: Cucujiformia
- Family: Curculionidae
- Tribe: Tropiphorini
- Genus: Dirotognathus; Horn, 1876

Genus of beetles

Dirotognathus is a genus of broad-nosed weevils in the beetle family Curculionidae. There are at least two described species in Dirotognathus.

== Species ==
These two species belong to the genus Dirotognathus:

- Dirotognathus punctatus Hatch, 1971^{i c g}
- Dirotognathus sordidus Horn, 1876^{i c g b}

Data sources: i = ITIS, c = Catalogue of Life, g = GBIF, b = Bugguide.net
