= Panscopus bufo =

Scientific classification
- Domain: Eukaryota
- Kingdom: Animalia
- Phylum: Arthropoda
- Class: Insecta
- Order: Coleoptera
- Suborder: Polyphaga
- Infraorder: Cucujiformia
- Family: Curculionidae
- Genus: Panscopus
- Species: P. bufo

Binomial name
- Panscopus bufo Buchanan, 1927

Species of beetle

Panscopus bufo is a species of broad-nosed weevil in the family Curculionidae. It is found in North America.
