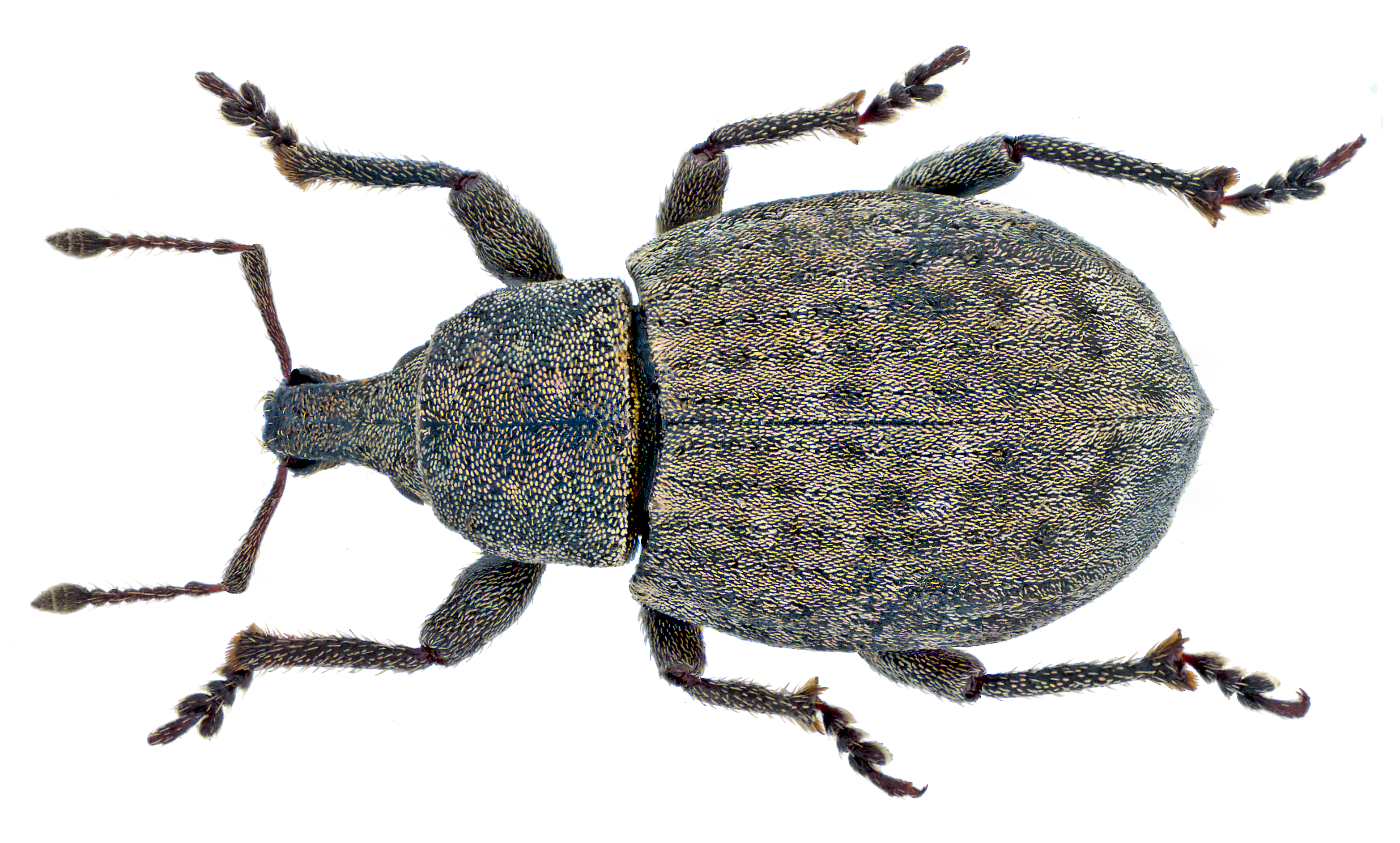

Scientific classification
- Domain: Eukaryota
- Kingdom: Animalia
- Phylum: Arthropoda
- Class: Insecta
- Order: Coleoptera
- Suborder: Polyphaga
- Infraorder: Cucujiformia
- Family: Curculionidae
- Genus: Tropiphorus
- Species: T. terricola

Binomial name
- Tropiphorus terricola (Newman, 1838)

= Tropiphorus terricola =

Species of beetle

Tropiphorus terricola is a species of broad-nosed weevil in the beetle family Curculionidae. It has a broad distribution through northern Europe, and has been introduced into North America.
