= Geniocremnus =

Scientific classification
- Kingdom: Animalia
- Phylum: Arthropoda
- Class: Insecta
- Order: Coleoptera
- Suborder: Polyphaga
- Infraorder: Cucujiformia
- Family: Curculionidae
- Genus: Geniocremnus; Kuschel, 1949

Genus of beetles

Geniocremnus is a genus of beetles belonging to the family Curculionidae.

Species:

- Geniocremnus angustirostris Blanchard, 1851
- Geniocremnus chiliensis (Boheman, 1842)
- Geniocremnus laticollis Blanchard, 1851
- Geniocremnus villosus Blanchard, 1851
