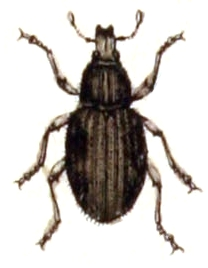
- Sciaphilus asperatus

Scientific classification
- Domain: Eukaryota
- Kingdom: Animalia
- Phylum: Arthropoda
- Class: Insecta
- Order: Coleoptera
- Suborder: Polyphaga
- Infraorder: Cucujiformia
- Family: Curculionidae
- Genus: Sciaphilus; Schönherr, 1823

= Sciaphilus =

Genus of beetles

Sciaphilus is a genus of beetles belonging to the family Curculionidae.

The species of this genus are found in Europe and Northern America.

Species:

- Sciaphilus asperatus (Bonsdorff, 1785)
- Sciaphilus costulatus Kiesenwetter, 1852
