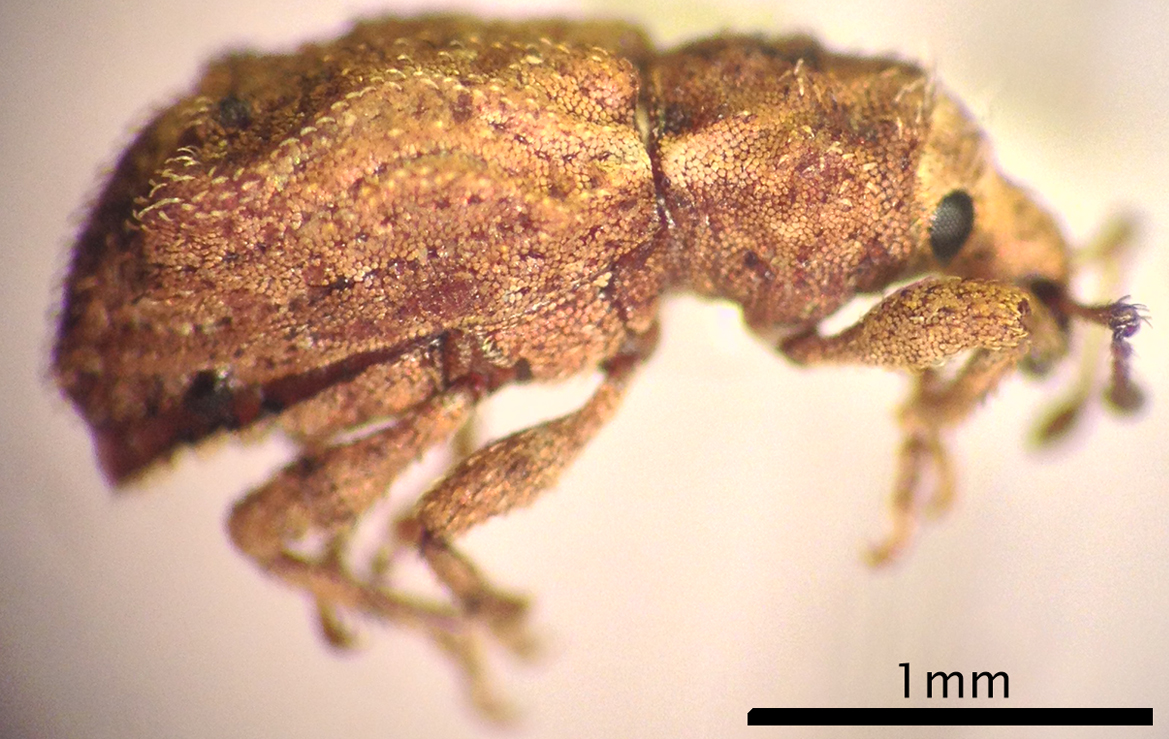
- Brachyolus bagooides, from Otago, New Zealand

Scientific classification
- Kingdom: Animalia
- Phylum: Arthropoda
- Clade: Pancrustacea
- Class: Insecta
- Order: Coleoptera
- Suborder: Polyphaga
- Infraorder: Cucujiformia
- Superfamily: Curculionoidea
- Family: Curculionidae
- Subfamily: Entiminae
- Genus: Brachyolus; White, 1846

= Brachyolus =

Genus of beetle

Brachyolus is a genus of broad-nosed weevil in the family Curculionidae.

== Species ==
Species accepted within the genus Brachyolus:

- Brachyolus bagooides Sharp, 1886
- Brachyolus bicostatus Broun, 1914
- Brachyolus huttoni Sharp, 1886
- Brachyolus labeculatus Broun, 1913
- Brachyolus longicollis Sharp, 1886
- Brachyolus nodirostris Broun, 1921
- Brachyolus obscurus Broun, 1921
- Brachyolus punctatus White, 1846
- Brachyolus varius Broun, 1913
