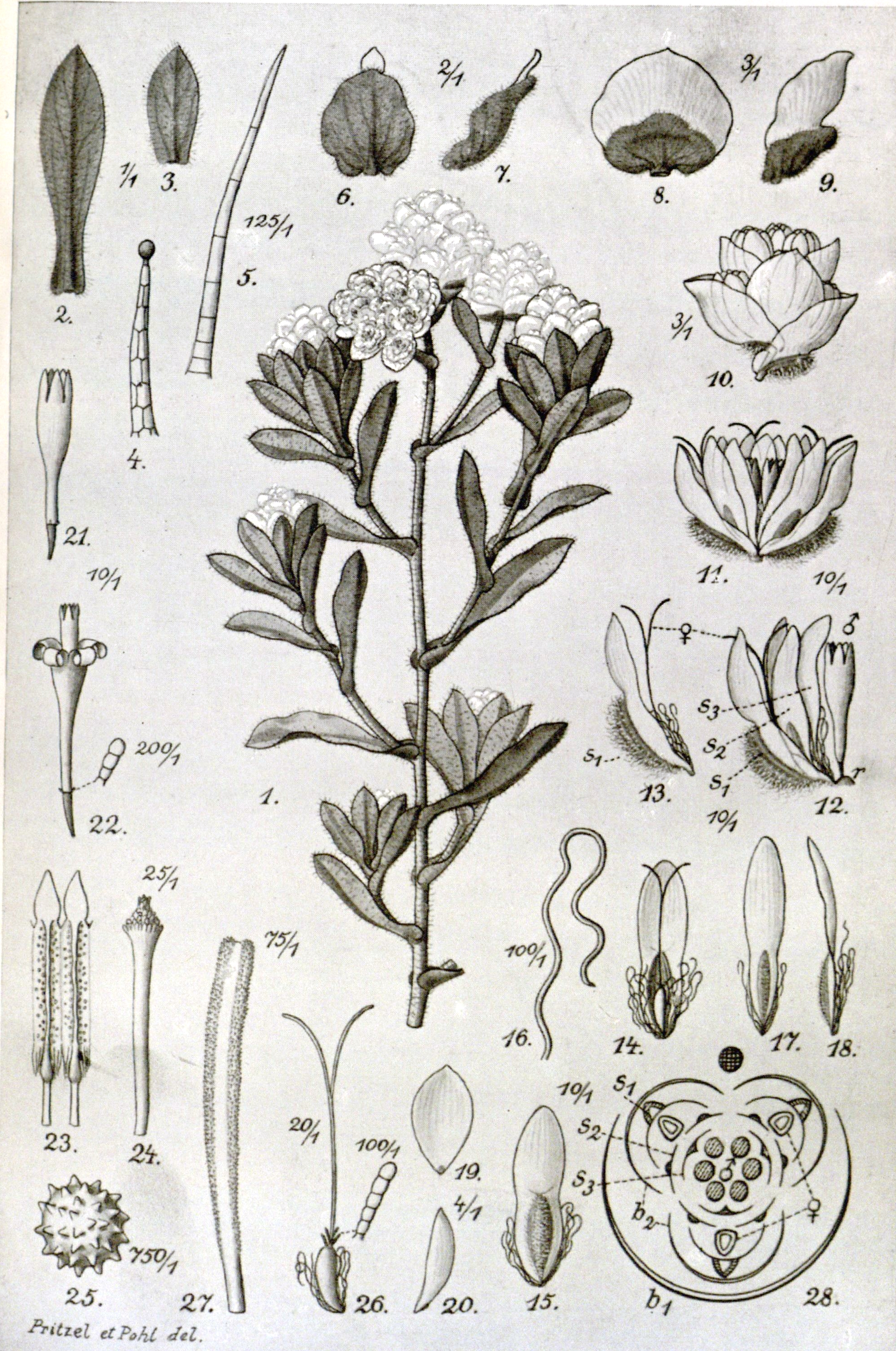

Scientific classification
- Kingdom: Plantae
- Clade: Tracheophytes
- Clade: Angiosperms
- Clade: Eudicots
- Clade: Asterids
- Order: Asterales
- Family: Asteraceae
- Subfamily: Asteroideae
- Tribe: Gnaphalieae
- Genus: Basedowia; E.Pritz.
- Species: B. tenerrima

Binomial name
- Basedowia tenerrima (F.Muell. & Tate) J.M.Black

Synonyms
- Basedowia helichrysoides Calomeria tenerrima Humea tenerrima

= Basedowia tenerrima =

Genus of plants

Basedowia is a monotypic genus of flowering plants in the aster family, Asteraceae, containing the single species Basedowia tenerrima.

This plant is endemic to northern South Australia, where it occurs in the Everard and Musgrave Ranges in Anangu Pitjantjatjara Yankunytjatjara. It is known from six locations. It has a disjunct distribution, occurring in patches of appropriate habitat that are spaced widely.

This is an ephemeral annual herb with thin, green leaves sheathing thin stems and rounded, white flower heads. It grows on rocky mountain slopes. It can become locally abundant when rain falls, with the seeds remaining in the soil for years between rainfall events.
