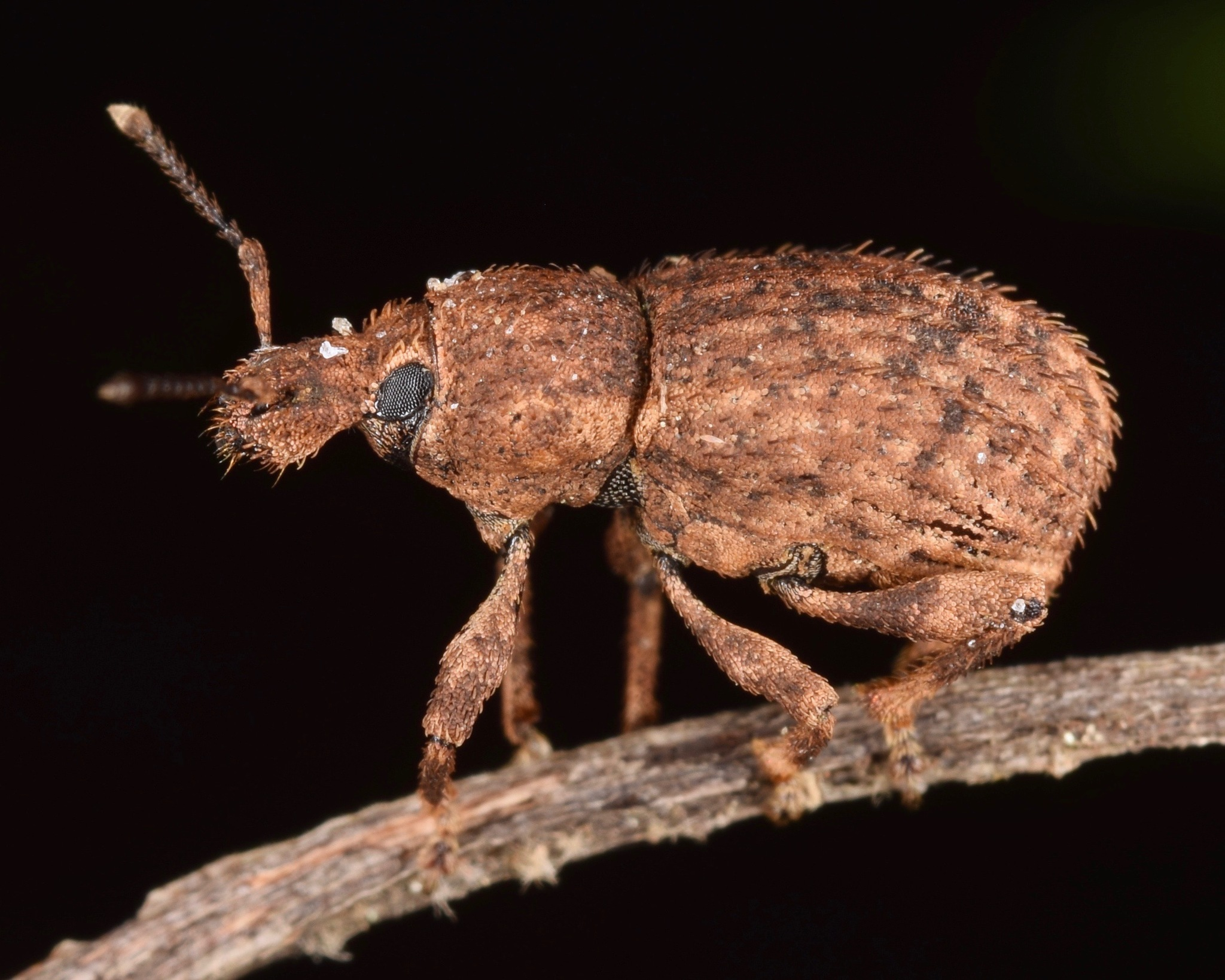
- Panscopus erinaceus, Georgia, US

Scientific classification
- Kingdom: Animalia
- Phylum: Arthropoda
- Class: Insecta
- Order: Coleoptera
- Suborder: Polyphaga
- Infraorder: Cucujiformia
- Superfamily: Curculionoidea
- Family: Curculionidae
- Genus: Panscopus; Schönherr, 1842

Synonyms
- Dolichonotus Buchanan, 1936; Nomidius Hatch, 1971; Panscopideus Blackwelder, 1939; Parapanscopus Buchanan, 1936; Pauscopus Chenu, 1860

= Panscopus =

Genus of beetles

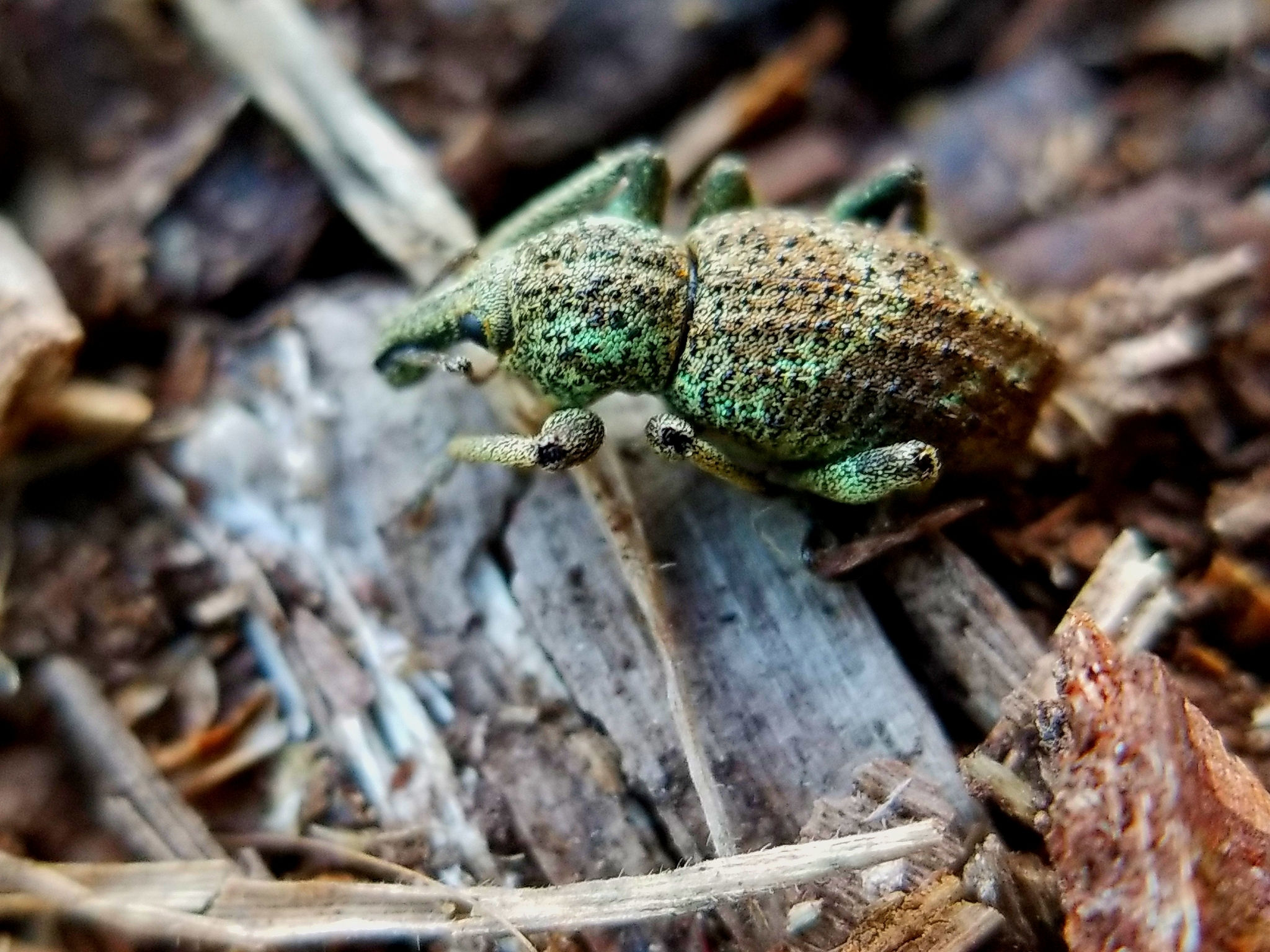
Panscopus gemmatus, Oregon

Panscopus is a genus of broad-nosed weevils in the beetle family Curculionidae. There are more than 30 described species in Panscopus, found in North America.

== Species ==
These 38 species belong to the genus Panscopus:

- Panscopus abruptus (Casey, 1895)
- Panscopus acutisetus Spanton, 2016
- Panscopus aequalis Buchanan, 1927
- Panscopus alternatus Schaeffer, 1908
- Panscopus bakeri Buchanan, 1936
- Panscopus bufo Buchanan, 1927
- Panscopus capizzii (Hatch, 1971)
- Panscopus carinatus Pierce, 1913
- Panscopus cinereus Schenkling & Marshall, 1931
- Panscopus coloradensis Van Dyke, 1936
- Panscopus convergens Buchanan, 1936
- Panscopus costatus Buchanan, 1927
- Panscopus dentipes Pierce, 1913
- Panscopus erinaceus (Say, 1832)
- Panscopus gemmatus (LeConte, 1857)
- Panscopus impressus Pierce, 1913
- Panscopus johnsoni Van Dyke, 1935
- Panscopus longus Buchanan, 1936
- Panscopus maculosus Blatchley, 1916
- Panscopus michelbacheri Ting, 1938
- Panscopus oregonensis Buchanan, 1936
- Panscopus ovalis Pierce, 1913
- Panscopus ovatipennis Buchanan, 1936
- Panscopus pallidus Buchanan, 1927
- Panscopus remotus Van Dyke, 1949
- Panscopus rufinasus Schoenherr, 1843
- Panscopus rugicollis Buchanan, 1927
- Panscopus schwarzi Buchanan, 1927
- Panscopus spantoni Bright, 2008
- Panscopus squamifrons Pierce, 1913
- Panscopus squamosus Pierce, 1913
- Panscopus sulcirostris Pierce, 1913
- Panscopus thoracicus Buchanan, 1936
- Panscopus torpidus Buchanan, 1927
- Panscopus tricarinatus Buchanan, 1927
- Panscopus verrucosus Buchanan, 1936
- Panscopus vestitus Pierce, 1913
- Panscopus wickhami Buchanan, 1936
