= Basedowia basicollis =

Scientific classification
- Kingdom: Animalia
- Phylum: Arthropoda
- Clade: Pancrustacea
- Class: Insecta
- Order: Coleoptera
- Suborder: Polyphaga
- Infraorder: Cucujiformia
- Family: Curculionidae
- Genus: Basedowia; Lea, 1930
- Species: B. basicollis

Binomial name
- Basedowia basicollis Lea, 1930

Genus of insects

Basedowia is a genus of beetles belonging to the family Curculionidae. Its only species is Basedowia basicollis.

The species of this genus are found in Australia.
