= Gabriel Bonsdorff =

Finnish entomologist (1762–1831)

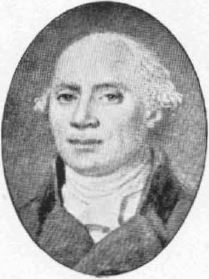
- Born: 1762; Porvoo, Uusimaa, Finland
- Died: 1831 (aged 68–69)
- Occupation: Entomologist
- Scientific career
- Fields: Entomology

Gabriel Bonsdorff (1762 in Borga – 1831) was a Finnish entomologist who specialised in Coleoptera, notably Curculionidae.

== Works ==
partial list

- 1785 with Laurentius G Borgström and Petrus Ant Norlin Historia naturalis curculionum Sveciae : cujus partem primam [-secundam], consent. experient. Facult. Med. examini offerunt.Upsaliae : Apud Johan Edman ..., [1785]
