= List of Bagous species =

This is a list of 363 species in the genus Bagous.

== Bagous species ==
- Bagous adelaidae Blackburn, 1894
- Bagous adspersus Foerster, 1849
- Bagous aegyptiacus Desbrochers, 1896
- Bagous aequatus Voss, 1953
- Bagous aereus Say, 1831
- Bagous aethiopicus Hustache, 1936
- Bagous affaber Faust, 1887
- Bagous affinis Hustache, 1926
- Bagous alexanderi O'Brien in O'Brien & Askevold, 1995
- Bagous aliciae Cmoluch, 1983
- Bagous alismatis Germar, 1817
- Bagous alpestris Hoffmann, 1955
- Bagous americanus LeConte, 1876
- Bagous ampliatus Thomson C.G., 1868
- Bagous anatolicus Caldara & O'Brien, 1998
- Bagous andalusicus González, 1971
- Bagous angolensis Hustache, 1923
- Bagous angustulus Thomson, 1870
- Bagous angustus Tanner, 1954
- Bagous apicalis O'Brien in O'Brien & Askevold, 1992
- Bagous arduus Sharp, 1917
- Bagous argillaceus Gyllenhal, 1836
- Bagous armoricanus Hoffmann, 1931
- Bagous atavus Oustalet, E., 1870
- Bagous atratus Blatchley, 1916
- Bagous atrirostris Dejean, 1821
- Bagous attenuatus Dejean, 1821
- Bagous australasiae Blackburn, 1894
- Bagous bagdadensis Pic, 1904
- Bagous beiranus Marshall, 1906
- Bagous belfragei (Burke, 1963)
- Bagous belloi Caldara & O'Brien, 1998
- Bagous bequaerti Hustache, 1924
- Bagous bergensis Marshall, 1953
- Bagous bicolor Foerster, B., 1891
- Bagous biimpressus Fåhraeus, 1845
- Bagous binodulus (Herbst, J.F.W., 1795)
- Bagous binotatus Stephens, 1829
- Bagous bipunctatus Billberg, 1820
- Bagous bisignatus Dejean, 1836
- Bagous bituberosus LeConte, 1876
- Bagous blanchardi Blatchley, 1916
- Bagous blatchleyi Tanner, 1943
- Bagous blyxae O'Brien in O'Brien & Askevold, 1992
- Bagous blyxodes O'Brien in O'Brien & Askevold, 1992
- Bagous brevipennis Kirsch, 1879
- Bagous brevis Gyllenhal, 1836
- Bagous brevitarsis Hansen, 1917
- Bagous brittoni O'Brien in O'Brien & Askevold, 1992
- Bagous brunneus Hustache, 1926
- Bagous bucciarelli Pesarini, 1980
- Bagous buchanani (Tanner, 1943)
- Bagous buckinghami O'Brien & Morimoto in O'Brien, Askevold & Morimoto, 1994
- Bagous bulgaricus Angelov, 1989
- Bagous californicus LeConte, 1876
- Bagous callosus O'Brien in O'Brien & Askevold, 1992
- Bagous carinatus Blatchley, 1925
- Bagous carpini Billberg, 1820
- Bagous caucasicus Faust, 1887
- Bagous caudatus Thomson C.G., 1865
- Bagous cavifrons LeConte, 1876
- Bagous chandleri Tanner, 1943
- Bagous charbinensis Voss, 1952
- Bagous chevrolati Tournier, 1874
- Bagous chinensis Zumpt, 1938
- Bagous chorinaeus Fåhraeus, 1845
- Bagous cinereus Dejean, 1830
- Bagous clarenciensis Blackburn, 1894
- Bagous claudicans Boheman, 1845
- Bagous cnemerythrus Schoenherr, 1825
- Bagous coenosus Gyllenhal, 1836
- Bagous collignensis (Herbst, J.F.W., 1797)
- Bagous colossus O'Brien in O'Brien & Askevold, 1995
- Bagous confusus O'Brien in O'Brien & Askevold, 1995
- Bagous congoanus Hustache, 1934
- Bagous conspertus Faust, 1888
- Bagous contrarius O'Brien in O'Brien & Askevold, 1995
- Bagous convexicollis Boheman, 1845
- Bagous corsicanus Hoffmann, 1936
- Bagous cosiensis Caldara & O'Brien, 1998
- Bagous costulatus Perris, 1870
- Bagous crassus Hoffmann, 1968
- Bagous crinalis
- Bagous crispus Faust, 1899
- Bagous cruentatus Sahlberg, 1900
- Bagous cryptocephalus Dejean, 1821
- Bagous curtirostris Fairmaire, 1873
- Bagous curtus Gyllenhal, 1845
- Bagous cylindricollis Hustache, 1923
- Bagous cylindricus Rosenhauer, 1856
- Bagous cylindrus Germar, 1817
- Bagous cyperorum Peyerimhoff, 1929
- Bagous czwalinae Seidlitz, 1891
- Bagous deceptus O'Brien in O'Brien & Askevold, 1995
- Bagous denticulatus Hustache, 1913
- Bagous descarpentriesi Hustache, 1933
- Bagous dieckmanni Gratshev, 1993
- Bagous dietzi Tanner, 1954
- Bagous difficilis O'Brien in O'Brien & Askevold, 1995
- Bagous diglyptus Boheman, 1845
- Bagous dilatatus Thomson C.G., 1868
- Bagous dilgiri Vazirani, 1977
- Bagous dogoanus Hoffmann, 1954
- Bagous dorsalis Perris, 1857
- Bagous dostinei O'Brien in O'Brien & Askevold, 1992
- Bagous dubius O'Brien in O'Brien & Askevold, 1992
- Bagous duprezi Hoffmann, 1950
- Bagous echinatus Waltl, J., 1839
- Bagous egenus Gyllenhal, 1836
- Bagous elegans Fabricus, 1801
- Bagous elongatus Dejean, 1821
- Bagous encaustus Boheman, 1845
- Bagous epirotes Caldara & O'Brien, 1998
- Bagous exilis Jacquelin du Val, 1854
- Bagous fastosus Hartmann, 1904
- Bagous fausti Schilsky, 1907
- Bagous femoralis O'Brien in O'Brien & Askevold, 1992
- Bagous floridanus Tanner, 1943
- Bagous formicetorum Jacquelin du Val, 1854
- Bagous fornoae O'Brien in O'Brien & Askevold, 1992
- Bagous forsteri Hartmann, 1899
- Bagous foveifrons Hustache, 1923
- Bagous fractodes O'Brien & Morimoto in O'Brien, Askevold & Morimoto, 1995
- Bagous fractus O'Brien & Morimoto in O'Brien, Askevold & Morimoto, 1994
- Bagous fragosus Marshall, 1920
- Bagous franzi González, 1967
- Bagous fremuthi Dieckmann, 1975
- Bagous freti Caldara & O'Brien, 1998
- Bagous frit Bedel, 1884
- Bagous fritodes O'Brien & Morimoto in O'Brien, Askevold & Morimoto, 1994
- Bagous frivaldszkyi Tournier, 1874
- Bagous frontalis O'Brien in O'Brien & Askevold, 1995
- Bagous fuentei Pic, 1908
- Bagous fuscus Colonnelli, 1986
- Bagous gaillardi Hustache, 1936
- Bagous gandalf Isajev & Gratshov, 1994
- Bagous geniculatodes O'Brien in O'Brien & Askevold, 1995
- Bagous geniculatus Seidlitz, 1875
- Bagous glabrirostris (Herbst, J.F.W., 1795)
- Bagous gracilentus Desbrochers, 1896
- Bagous gracilis Egorov & Grachev in Lelei (ed.), 1990
- Bagous guttatus Desbrochers, 1896
- Bagous haematopus Gyllenhal, 1836
- Bagous haesleri Newbery, 1902
- Bagous halophilus Redtenbacher, 1849
- Bagous henoni Hustache, 1927
- Bagous hipponensis Pic, 1928
- Bagous hochhuthi Tournier, 1874
- Bagous hovanus Hustache, 1920
- Bagous humeralis Marshall, 1906
- Bagous humeridens Hustache, 1926
- Bagous hybridus Hustache, 1923
- Bagous hydrillae O'Brien in O'Brien & Askevold, 1992
- Bagous ibericus González, 1971
- Bagous ibis Karasyov, 1995
- Bagous impressus Fairmaire, 1898
- Bagous inceratus Gyllenhal, 1836
- Bagous indistinctus O'Brien in O'Brien & Askevold, 1995
- Bagous inermis Desbrochers, 1896
- Bagous infrequens O'Brien in O'Brien & Askevold, 1992
- Bagous inquinamentus Gyllenhal, 1836
- Bagous intermedius Voss, 1935
- Bagous interpositus Hartmann, 1899
- Bagous interruptus Faust, 1891
- Bagous josephi O'Brien in O'Brien & Askevold, 1992
- Bagous joyi O'Brien in O'Brien & Askevold, 1995
- Bagous juvenilis Hoffmann, 1955
- Bagous kagiashi Chûjô & Morimoto, 1959
- Bagous kirschi Reitter, 1884
- Bagous kraatzi Brisout H., 1863
- Bagous laevigatus O'Brien & Pajni, 1989
- Bagous latepunctatus Pic, 1904
- Bagous lateralis Hustache, 1937
- Bagous laticollis Gyllenhal, 1836
- Bagous lengi Tanner, 1943
- Bagous leonhardi Schilsky, 1907
- Bagous leprieuri Guillebeau, 1890
- Bagous lewisi O'Brien & Morimoto in O'Brien, Askevold & Morimoto, 1994
- Bagous libanicus Schilsky, 1911
- Bagous limnophilae O'Brien in O'Brien & Askevold, 1995
- Bagous limosus Schoenherr, 1836
- Bagous loisae O'Brien in O'Brien & Askevold, 1995
- Bagous longirostris Vitale, 1904
- Bagous longirostrus Tanner, 1943
- Bagous longitarsis Seidlitz, 1891
- Bagous longulus Gyllenhal, 1836
- Bagous lothari Caldara & O'Brien, 1998
- Bagous lunatoides O'Brien, 1979
- Bagous lunatus Blatchley, 1916
- Bagous luteitarsis Hustache, 1926
- Bagous lutosus Schoenherr, 1825
- Bagous lutulentus Billberg, 1820
- Bagous lutulosus Schoenherr, 1836
- Bagous lyali Caldara & O'Brien, 1998
- Bagous lyauteyi Hoffmann, 1952
- Bagous macedon Caldara & O'Brien, 1998
- Bagous maculatus Blatchley, 1916
- Bagous madecassus Fairmaire, 1897
- Bagous magister LeConte, 1876
- Bagous major Fowler, 1913
- Bagous mamillatus Say, 1831
- Bagous mandshuricus Egorov & Grachev in Lelei (ed.), 1990
- Bagous marginicollis Hustache, 1937
- Bagous maroccanus Hustache, 1923
- Bagous matthewsi O'Brien in O'Brien & Askevold, 1992
- Bagous meregallii Caldara & O'Brien, 1998
- Bagous meridionalis O'Brien in O'Brien & Askevold, 1992
- Bagous micaceus Hustache, 1924
- Bagous mingrelicus Tournier, 1874
- Bagous minor O'Brien & Morimoto in O'Brien, Askevold & Morimoto, 1994
- Bagous minutissimus Faust, 1887
- Bagous minutus Hochhuth, 1847
- Bagous monanthiphagus Stueben, 2010
- Bagous mucronatus Caldara & O'Brien, 1998
- Bagous mukanaensis Voss, 1962
- Bagous mulsanti Acloque, 1896
- Bagous mundanus Boheman, 1845
- Bagous muticus Thomson C.G., 1868
- Bagous myriophylli O'Brien in O'Brien & Askevold, 1995
- Bagous myrmidon Hustache, 1920
- Bagous natator O'Brien in O'Brien & Askevold, 1992
- Bagous nebulosus LeConte, 1876
- Bagous nigrinus O'Brien & Pajni in O'Brien & Askevold, 1995
- Bagous nigripes Sahlberg J., 1900
- Bagous nigritarsis Thomson C.G., 1865
- Bagous niloticus Aurivillius, 1905
- Bagous nipponensis O'Brien & Morimoto in O'Brien, Askevold & Morimoto, 1995
- Bagous nodieri Hustache, 1926
- Bagous nodulosus Gyllenhal, 1836
- Bagous nupharis Apfelbeck, 1906
- Bagous nymphaeae Faust, 1888
- Bagous obliquus LeConte, 1876
- Bagous obscurus Rey, 1895
- Bagous occiduus O'Brien in O'Brien & Askevold, 1992
- Bagous occultus O'Brien & Morimoto in O'Brien, Askevold & Morimoto, 1994
- Bagous ochraceus Blatchley & Leng, 1916
- Bagous olcesei Tournier, 1874
- Bagous oleae Costa, 1839
- Bagous osellai Caldara & O'Brien, 1998
- Bagous ovalipennis Hustache, 1939
- Bagous ovoidens Hustache, 1926
- Bagous ovoideus Hustache, 1926
- Bagous palintonus Foerster, B., 1891
- Bagous pallidipes Pic, M., 1900
- Bagous parvus O'Brien in O'Brien & Askevold, 1995
- Bagous pauxillulus O'Brien in O'Brien & Askevold, 1992
- Bagous pauxillus Blatchley, 1916
- Bagous peregrinus Gratshev, 1993
- Bagous perparvulus Rosenhauer, 1856
- Bagous petro Germar, 1842
- Bagous petrosus Schoenherr, 1845
- Bagous picirostris Billberg, 1820
- Bagous picturatus Egorov & Grachev in Lelei (ed.), 1990
- Bagous pictus Blatchley, 1920
- Bagous pilipes Desbrochers, 1896
- Bagous pilitarsis Hustache, 1923
- Bagous pilumnus Sturm, 1826
- Bagous pistiae Marshall, 1957
- Bagous planatus LeConte, 1876
- Bagous polysignatus Hoffmann, 1968
- Bagous poophagoides Egorov & Grachev in Lelei (ed.), 1990
- Bagous productus Dejean, 1821
- Bagous promontorii Marshall, 1906
- Bagous propinquus O'Brien in O'Brien & Askevold, 1992
- Bagous proprius O'Brien & Morimoto in O'Brien, Askevold & Morimoto, 1994
- Bagous proximus O'Brien in O'Brien & Askevold, 1992
- Bagous pueli Hoffmann, 1950
- Bagous puncticollis Boheman, 1845
- Bagous punctipennis Marshall, 1906
- Bagous purcelli O'Brien in O'Brien & Askevold, 1992
- Bagous puritanus Blatchley, 1916
- Bagous pusillus LeConte, 1876
- Bagous pygmaeodes O'Brien & Morimoto in O'Brien, Askevold & Morimoto, 1994
- Bagous pygmaeus Voss, 1940
- Bagous pyrrhocnemis Gyllenhal, 1836
- Bagous pyrrhocnemodes O'Brien in O'Brien & Askevold, 1995
- Bagous quadrimaculatus O'Brien in O'Brien & Askevold, 1995
- Bagous quadrinodulosus Hustache, 1932
- Bagous ramamurthyi O'Brien in O'Brien & Askevold, 1995
- Bagous remaudierei Hoffmann, 1954
- Bagous restrictus LeConte, 1876
- Bagous revelierei Tournier, 1874
- Bagous riedeli Caldara & O'Brien, 1998
- Bagous rieki O'Brien in O'Brien & Askevold, 1992
- Bagous robustior Pic, M., 1900
- Bagous robustoides Neresheimer & Wagner, 1932
- Bagous robustus Brisout H., 1863
- Bagous rotundatus O'Brien & Morimoto in O'Brien, Askevold & Morimoto, 1994
- Bagous rotundicollis Boheman, 1845
- Bagous rudicollis Desbrochers, 1896
- Bagous rudis Sharp, 1917
- Bagous rufimanus Hoffmann, 1955
- Bagous rufipennis Egorov & Grachev in Lelei (ed.), 1990
- Bagous ruykyuensis O'Brien & Morimoto in O'Brien, Askevold & Morimoto, 1994
- Bagous sabellai Caldara & O'Brien, 1998
- Bagous sahlbergi Schilsky, 1911
- Bagous salebrosus O'Brien & Pajni in O'Brien & Askevold, 1995
- Bagous sardiniensis Brisout H., 1863
- Bagous scanicus Billberg, 1820
- Bagous sellatus LeConte, 1876
- Bagous semilunatus Desbrochers, 1895
- Bagous senegalensis Marshall, 1906
- Bagous septemcostatus Chevrolat, 1860
- Bagous setiger Perris, 1857
- Bagous severopolinus Fairmaire, 1857
- Bagous shaowuanus Voss, 1953
- Bagous siamensis Hustache, 1926
- Bagous sibiricus Gebler,
- Bagous sicardi Hustache, 1933
- Bagous sii Billberg, 1820
- Bagous similis O'Brien in O'Brien & Askevold, 1995
- Bagous simplex Say, 1831
- Bagous simulans O'Brien in O'Brien & Askevold, 1992
- Bagous sjobergi Bruce, 1968
- Bagous spadiceus Dejean, 1830
- Bagous spiculatus O'Brien & Morimoto in O'Brien, Askevold & Morimoto, 1994
- Bagous striatulus Fairmaire, 1904
- Bagous subcarinatus Gyllenhal, 1836
- Bagous subcordatus O'Brien & Morimoto in O'Brien, Askevold & Morimoto, 1994
- Bagous subcostulatus Desbrochers, 1896
- Bagous subruber Reitter, 1890
- Bagous subvittatus O'Brien & Morimoto in O'Brien, Askevold & Morimoto, 1994
- Bagous sulcicollis Hartmann, 1899
- Bagous sumatrensis Faust, 1891
- Bagous syriacus Schilsky, 1907
- Bagous tanneri O'Brien, 1979
- Bagous tarsalis O'Brien in O'Brien & Askevold, 1992
- Bagous temperei Hoffmann, 1950
- Bagous tempestivus (Herbst, J.F.W., 1795)
- Bagous tenietensis Desbrochers, 1896
- Bagous tersus Egorov & Grachev in Lelei (ed.), 1990
- Bagous tessellatus Foerster, 1849
- Bagous texanus Tanner, 1943
- Bagous thomsoni Bruce, 1968
- Bagous tibialis Stephens, 1829
- Bagous tigris Billberg, 1820
- Bagous tingi Tanner, 1943
- Bagous tiubulus Caldara & O'Brien, 1994
- Bagous tomlini Sharp, 1917
- Bagous tonkinianus Hustache, 1926
- Bagous tophyosus Gyllenhal, 1836
- Bagous tournieri Pic, 1894
- Bagous transversus LeConte, 1876
- Bagous trapae Baldev Parshad, 1961
- Bagous tuberculosus O'Brien in O'Brien & Askevold, 1995
- Bagous tuberosus (Tanner, 1943)
- Bagous tubulus Caldara & O'Brien, 1994
- Bagous turkmenicus Gratshev, 1993
- Bagous unguicularis Hustache, 1927
- Bagous uralensis Gratshev, 1993
- Bagous utriculariae O'Brien in O'Brien & Askevold, 1992
- Bagous vadonus Hustache, 1956
- Bagous vafer Marshall, 1958
- Bagous validitarsus Boheman, 1845
- Bagous validus Rosenhauer, 1847
- Bagous vicinus Hustache, 1926
- Bagous virgatoidas Voss, 1932
- Bagous virgatoides Voss, 1932
- Bagous vivesi González, 1967
- Bagous wagneri Dieckmann, 1964
- Bagous yamazakii O'Brien & Morimoto in O'Brien, Askevold & Morimoto, 1995
- Bagous youngi O'Brien & Morimoto in O'Brien, Askevold & Morimoto, 1994
- Bagous yunnanica Voss, 1932
