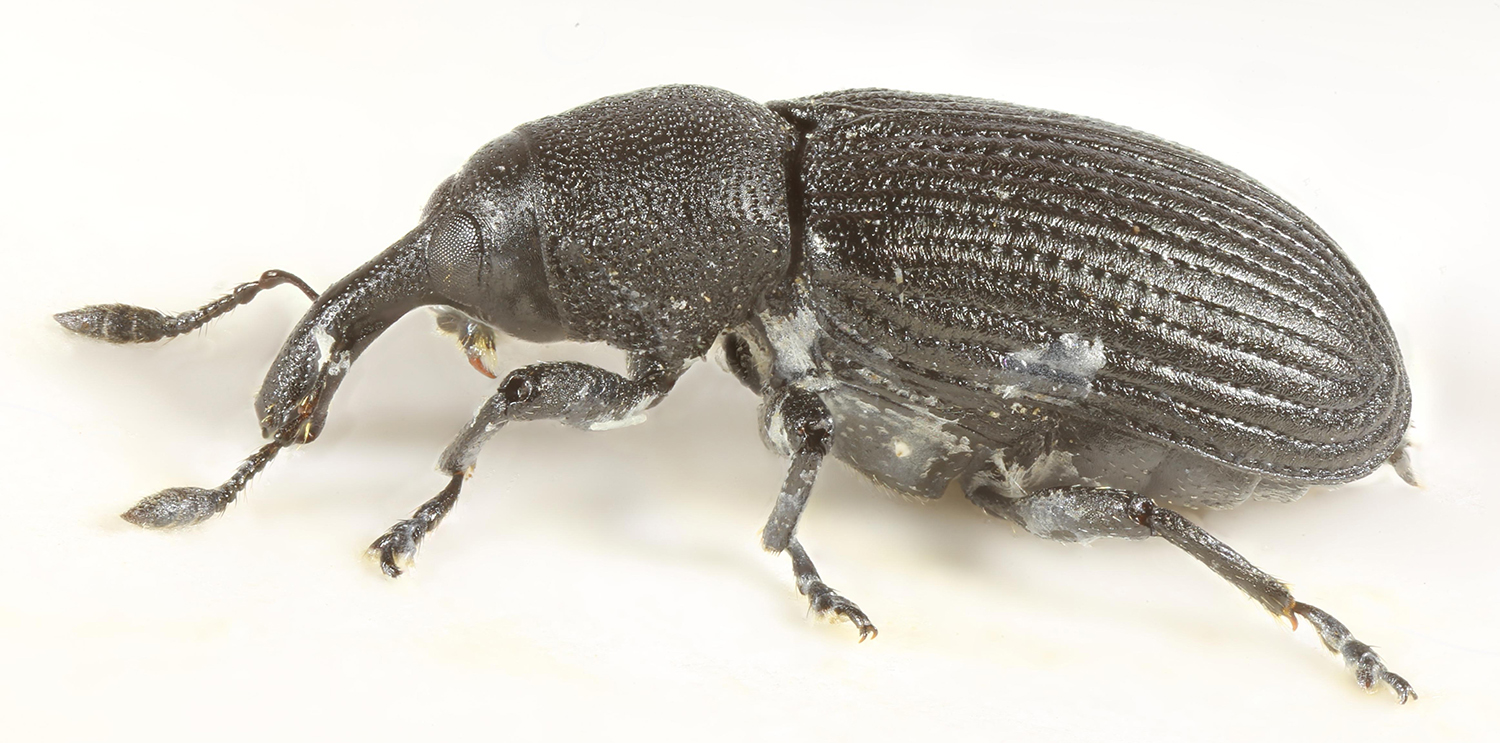
- Magdalis armigera

Scientific classification
- Kingdom: Animalia
- Phylum: Arthropoda
- Class: Insecta
- Order: Coleoptera
- Suborder: Polyphaga
- Infraorder: Cucujiformia
- Family: Curculionidae
- Subfamily: Mesoptiliinae; Lacordaire, 1863

Tribes
- Carciliini; Laemosaccini; Magdalidini; Mesoptiliini

= Mesoptiliinae =

Subfamily of beetles

Mesoptiliinae is a subfamily of true weevils in the family Curculionidae. There are at about 23 genera and 40 described species in Mesoptiliinae.

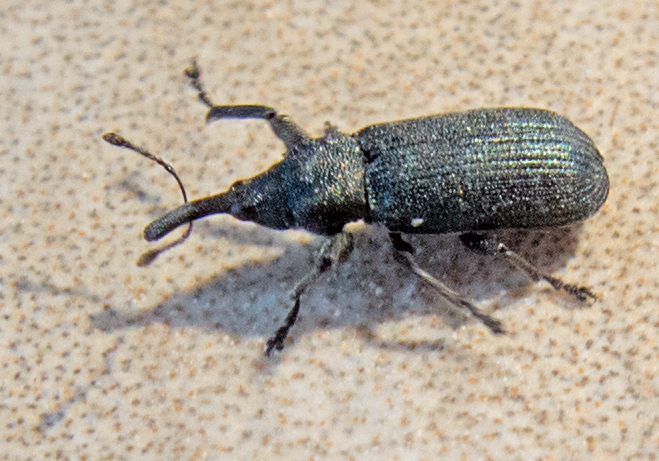
Magdalis phlegmatica

== Genera ==
These 23 genera belong to the subfamily Mesoptiliinae:

- Aethemagdalis Zimmerman, 1994^{c g}
- Allolaemosaccus Zimmerman, 1994^{c g}
- Allomagdalis Kuschel, 1950^{c g}
- Apocnemidophorus Hustache, 1937^{c g}
- Atopomagdalis Zimmerman, 1994
- Carcilia Roelofs, 1874^{c g}
- Cnemidontus Schenlding, 1935^{c g}
- Corynodoceras Kuschel, 1950^{c g}
- Eumagdalis K. Daniel, 1903^{c g}
- Habromagdalis Kuschel, 1950^{c g}
- Heteromagdalis Elgueta, 1985^{c g}
- Laemosaccellus Zimmerman, 1994^{c g}
- Laemosaccodes Voss, 1937^{c g}
- Laemosaccus Schoenherr, 1823^{i c g b}
- Magdalis Germar, 1817^{i c g b}
- Melaemosaccus Zimmerman, 1994^{c g}
- Mesoptilius Labram & Imhoft, 1845^{c g}
- Micromagdalis Kuschel, 1950^{c g}
- Neolaemosaccus Hustache, 1937^{c g}
- Neomagdalis Kuschel, 1950^{c g}
- Notomagdalis Zimmerman, 1994^{c g}
- Prionomagdalis Kuschel, 1955^{c g}
- Trichomagdalis Fall, 1913^{i c g b}

Data sources: i = ITIS, c = Catalogue of Life, g = GBIF, b = Bugguide.net
