= List of Laemosaccus species =

This is a list of 137 species in Laemosaccus, a genus of true weevils in the family Curculionidae.

== Laemosaccus species ==
- Laemosaccus aciculaticollis Hustache, 1937^{c}
- Laemosaccus affaber Boheman, 1844^{c}
- Laemosaccus albiventris Hustache, 1937^{c}
- Laemosaccus angulatus Janczyk, 1959^{c}
- Laemosaccus angustifrons Hustache, 1938^{c}
- Laemosaccus argenteus Lea, A.M., 1896^{c}
- Laemosaccus ater Lea, A.M., 1896^{c}
- Laemosaccus atratus Champion, G.C., 1903^{c}
- Laemosaccus aureus Hustache, 1937^{c}
- Laemosaccus australis Boisduval, 1835^{c}
- Laemosaccus basalis Hustache, 1937^{c}
- Laemosaccus bidentatus Lea, 1927^{c}
- Laemosaccus bilobus Lea, A.M., 1899^{c}
- Laemosaccus biseriatus Lea, 1927^{c}
- Laemosaccus blandus Pascoe, F.P., 1886^{c}
- Laemosaccus brasiliensis Hustache, 1937^{c}
- Laemosaccus brevipennis Pascoe, F.P., 1870^{c}
- Laemosaccus brevis Lea, A.M., 1899^{c}
- Laemosaccus bufonius Janczyk, 1959^{c}
- Laemosaccus calotrichus Lea, 1927^{c}
- Laemosaccus canaliculatus Hustache, 1937^{c}
- Laemosaccus carinicollis Lea, A.M., 1896^{c}
- Laemosaccus carinipyga Hustache, 1937^{c}
- Laemosaccus castaneipennis Hustache, 1937^{c}
- Laemosaccus castaneus Philippi, 1864^{c}
- Laemosaccus catenatus Pascoe, F.P., 1871^{c}
- Laemosaccus chadwicki Janczyk, 1966^{c}
- Laemosaccus chevrolati Guérin-Méneville, F.E., 1829-44^{c}
- Laemosaccus chevrolatii Guérin-Méneville, 1844^{c}
- Laemosaccus compactus Lea, A.M., 1896^{c}
- Laemosaccus copturoides Voss, 1937^{c}
- Laemosaccus cossonoides Lea, A.M., 1896^{c}
- Laemosaccus crassicollis Blanchard, E. in Gay, 1851^{c}
- Laemosaccus crassirostris Bovie in Wytsman, 1909^{c}
- Laemosaccus cristaticollis Blanchard, E. in Gay, 1851^{c}
- Laemosaccus crucicollis Lea, A.M., 1896^{c}
- Laemosaccus cryptonyx Pascoe, F.P., 1872^{c}
- Laemosaccus cylindricus Lea, 1927^{c}
- Laemosaccus cylindrirostris Lea, 1927^{c}
- Laemosaccus dapsilis Pascoe, F.P., 1872^{c}
- Laemosaccus drewsi Bondar, 1947^{c}
- Laemosaccus dubius Lea, A.M., 1896^{c}
- Laemosaccus ebenus Pascoe, F.P., 1886^{c}
- Laemosaccus electilis Pascoe, F.P., 1871^{c}
- Laemosaccus erythronotus Champion, G.C., 1903^{c}
- Laemosaccus exaratus Champion, G.C., 1903^{c}
- Laemosaccus exsculptus Champion, G.C., 1903^{c}
- Laemosaccus festivus Lea, A.M., 1896^{c}
- Laemosaccus frater Lea, A.M., 1899^{c}
- Laemosaccus frontalis Kirsch, T., 1875^{c}
- Laemosaccus fulvirostris Pascoe, F.P., 1873^{c}
- Laemosaccus funereus Pascoe, F.P., 1873^{c}
- Laemosaccus fuscicornis Hustache, 1937^{c}
- Laemosaccus germari Boheman, 1844^{c}
- Laemosaccus gibbosus Pascoe, F.P., 1873^{c}
- Laemosaccus guyanensis Hustache, 1937^{c}
- Laemosaccus hamatus Champion, G.C., 1903^{c}
- Laemosaccus haustellatus Lea, 1927^{c}
- Laemosaccus hieroglyphicus Lea, 1911^{c}
- Laemosaccus imitator Lea, 1927^{c}
- Laemosaccus instabilis Lea, A.M., 1896^{c}
- Laemosaccus insularis Pascoe, F.P., 1885^{c}
- Laemosaccus janczyki Wibmer & O'Brien, 1986^{c}
- Laemosaccus judaicus Lea, A.M., 1899^{c}
- Laemosaccus lacertosus Janczyk, 1959^{c}
- Laemosaccus latirostris Lea, 1927^{c}
- Laemosaccus leucopectoralis Voss, 1937^{c}
- Laemosaccus longiceps Pascoe, F.P., 1873^{c}
- Laemosaccus longimanus Pascoe, F.P., 1872^{c}
- Laemosaccus lucens Hustache, 1937^{c}
- Laemosaccus maculatus Champion, G.C., 1903^{c}
- Laemosaccus magdaloides Pascoe, F.P., 1873^{c}
- Laemosaccus marmoratus Lea, 1927^{c}
- Laemosaccus melanocephalus Lea, A.M., 1899^{c}
- Laemosaccus microps Lea, 1927^{c}
- Laemosaccus narinus Pascoe, F.P., 1872^{c}
- Laemosaccus nephele (Herbst, 1797)^{i c g}
- Laemosaccus nigriceps Lea, 1911^{c}
- Laemosaccus nigrirostris Lea, 1927^{c}
- Laemosaccus nigrotuberosus Fairmaire, L., 1883^{c}
- Laemosaccus niveonotatus Lea, 1927^{c}
- Laemosaccus notatus Pascoe, F.P., 1871^{c}
- Laemosaccus obscurus Lea, A.M., 1896^{c}
- Laemosaccus obsoletus Blanchard, E. in Gay, 1851^{c}
- Laemosaccus occidentalis Lea, A.M., 1896^{c}
- Laemosaccus ocularis Pascoe, F.P., 1873^{c}
- Laemosaccus pascoei Hustache, 1937^{c}
- Laemosaccus peccuarius Pascoe, F.P., 1871^{c}
- Laemosaccus persimilis Hustache, 1937^{c}
- Laemosaccus peruvianus Hustache, 1937^{c}
- Laemosaccus petulans Pascoe, F.P., 1885^{c}
- Laemosaccus pictus Hustache, 1937^{c}
- Laemosaccus plagiatus Schoenherr, 1823^{c}
- Laemosaccus pruinosus Blanchard, E. in Gay, 1851^{c}
- Laemosaccus pubicollis Lea, 1927^{c}
- Laemosaccus pullus Hustache, 1937^{c}
- Laemosaccus pustulatus Gyllenhal, 1836^{c}
- Laemosaccus quadripustulatus Schoenherr, 1839^{c}
- Laemosaccus quadriseriatus Lea, 1927^{c}
- Laemosaccus querulus Pascoe, F.P., 1873^{c}
- Laemosaccus radiatus Champion, G.C., 1903^{c}
- Laemosaccus rivularis Lea, A.M., 1899^{c}
- Laemosaccus rufescens Pascoe, F.P., 1886^{c}
- Laemosaccus ruficornis Champion, G.C., 1903^{c}
- Laemosaccus rufipennis Lea, A.M., 1896^{c}
- Laemosaccus rufipes Lea, A.M., 1896^{c}
- Laemosaccus rufirostris Lea, 1927^{c}
- Laemosaccus rufus Boheman, 1844^{c}
- Laemosaccus salebrosus Champion, G.C., 1903^{c}
- Laemosaccus scriptus Champion, G.C., 1903^{c}
- Laemosaccus sculpturatus Champion, G.C., 1903^{c}
- Laemosaccus scutellaris Lea, 1927^{c}
- Laemosaccus semicrudus Lea, 1927^{c}
- Laemosaccus semirufus Hustache, 1937^{c}
- Laemosaccus semiustus Pascoe, F.P., 1873^{c}
- Laemosaccus silbermanni Chevrolat in Guérin-Méneville, F.E., 1829-44^{c}
- Laemosaccus silbermannii Chevrolat in Guérin-Méneville, 1844^{c}
- Laemosaccus subcylindricus Lea, 1927^{c}
- Laemosaccus subsignatus Boheman, 1844^{c}
- Laemosaccus sulcifrons Champion, 1910^{c}
- Laemosaccus synopticus Pascoe, F.P., 1870^{c}
- Laemosaccus tantulus Pascoe, F.P., 1870^{c}
- Laemosaccus tarsalis Pascoe, F.P., 1873^{c}
- Laemosaccus tenuirostris Lea, 1927^{c}
- Laemosaccus texanus Champion, 1903^{i c b}
- Laemosaccus thorey Janczyk, 1957^{c}
- Laemosaccus triangulatus Janczyk, 1957^{c}
- Laemosaccus triseriatus Lea, 1927^{c}
- Laemosaccus tropicus Lea, 1911^{c}
- Laemosaccus trucidatus Schoenherr, 1844^{c}
- Laemosaccus unicolor Blanchard, E. in Gay, 1851^{c}
- Laemosaccus ustulus Pascoe, F.P., 1871^{c}
- Laemosaccus variabilis Lea, A.M., 1896^{c}
- Laemosaccus variegatus Lea, A.M., 1899^{c}
- Laemosaccus varius Bovie in Wytsman, 1909^{c}
- Laemosaccus ventralis Lea, A.M., 1896^{c}
- Laemosaccus virgulatus Hustache, 1937^{c}

Data sources: i = ITIS, c = Catalogue of Life, g = GBIF, b = Bugguide.net
