= Bagous elegans =

Scientific classification
- Domain: Eukaryota
- Kingdom: Animalia
- Phylum: Arthropoda
- Class: Insecta
- Order: Coleoptera
- Suborder: Polyphaga
- Infraorder: Cucujiformia
- Family: Curculionidae
- Genus: Bagous
- Species: B. elegans

Binomial name
- Bagous elegans (Fabricius, 1801)

Species of beetle

Bagous elegans is a species of weevil in the subfamily Bagoinae. It is found in Europe, and feeds on Phragmites australis. Adults are flightless, spending much of their life underwater.
