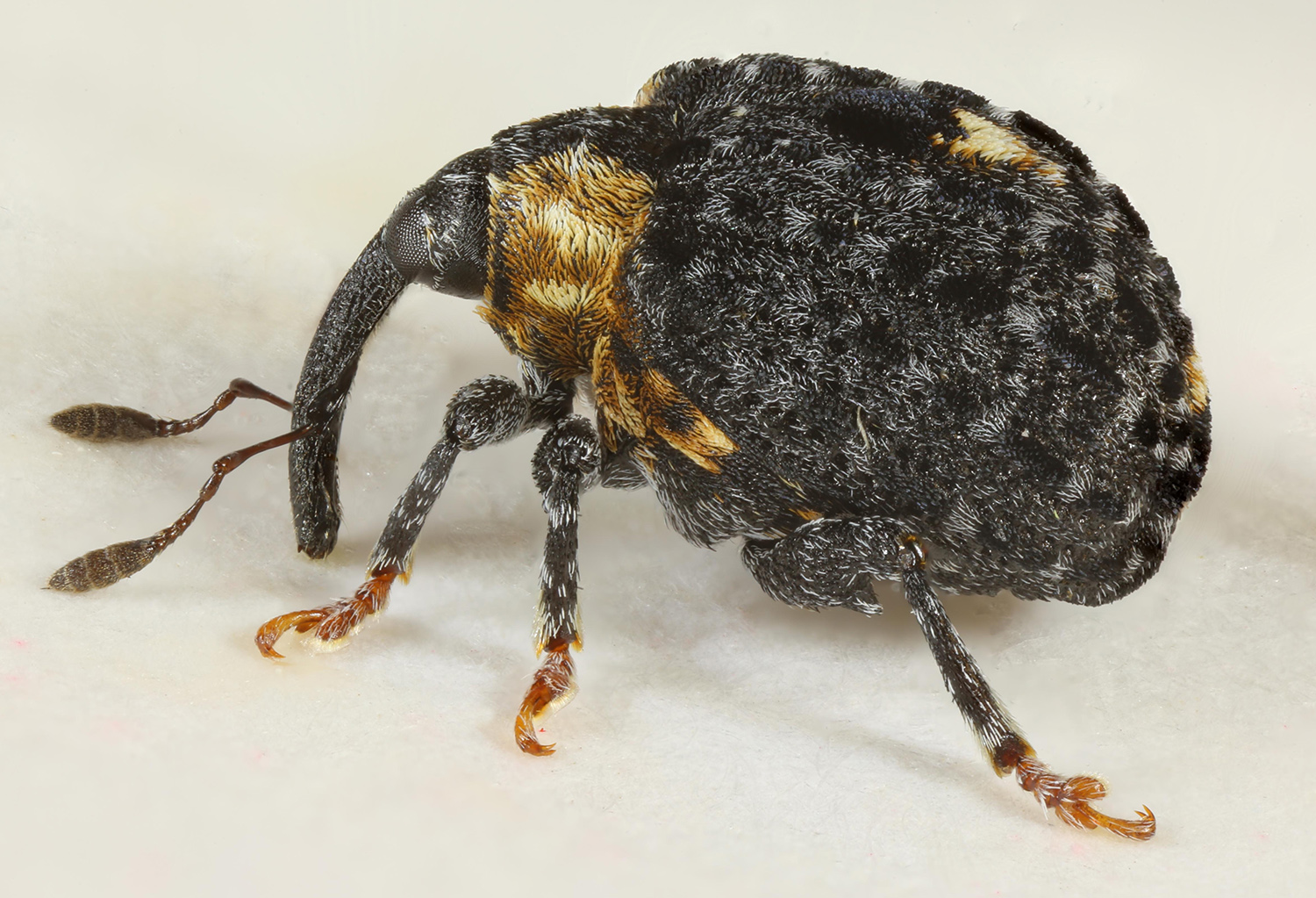
- A specimen observed in North Wales

Scientific classification
- Domain: Eukaryota
- Kingdom: Animalia
- Phylum: Arthropoda
- Class: Insecta
- Order: Coleoptera
- Suborder: Polyphaga
- Infraorder: Cucujiformia
- Family: Curculionidae
- Genus: Cionus
- Species: C. tuberculosus

Binomial name
- Cionus tuberculosus (Scopoli, 1763)

= Cionus tuberculosus =

Species of beetle

Cionus tuberculosus, is a species of weevil native to Europe. The species was first described by Giovanni Antonio Scopoli in 1763.

== Distribution and habitat ==
The species can be found in Europe. Observations on the platform INaturalist spread as far north as Stockholm, Denmark, and Liverpool. The eastern end are the Ural Mountains. The southern edge lies in southern France and the Po Valley. The western edge lies in Cornwall and Brittany.

The habitat is tied to the presence of figworts, which are ponds, streams or hedge banks.

== Naming ==
In German the common name is "Dunkler Braunwurzschaber" (dark figworts scraper), which highlights the species preference for "Braunwurzgewächse" (the figwort family Scrophulariaceae) or "Braunwurzen" (figworts, the genus Scrophularia). The prefix "dark" distinguishes it from the "Weißschildiger Braunwurzschaber" (white-shielded figworts scraper), the Cionus scrophulariae (figwort weevil).
