= Magdalis imbellis =

Scientific classification
- Domain: Eukaryota
- Kingdom: Animalia
- Phylum: Arthropoda
- Class: Insecta
- Order: Coleoptera
- Suborder: Polyphaga
- Infraorder: Cucujiformia
- Family: Curculionidae
- Genus: Magdalis
- Species: M. imbellis

Binomial name
- Magdalis imbellis (LeConte, 1857)

Species of beetle

Magdalis imbellis is a species of wedge-shaped bark weevils in the family Curculionidae. It is found in North America.
