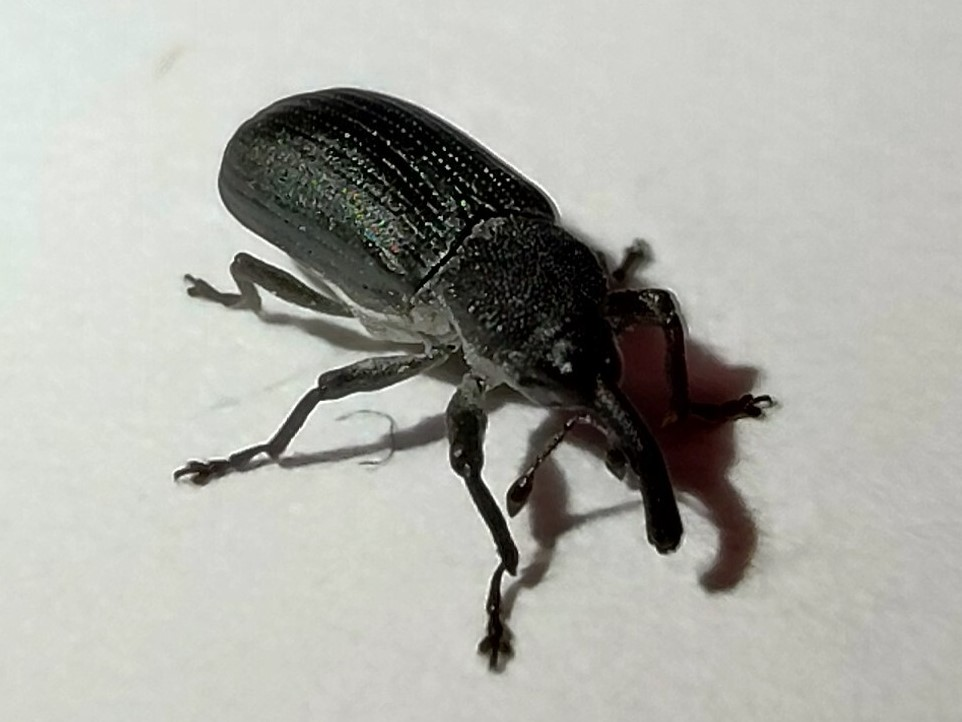

Scientific classification
- Kingdom: Animalia
- Phylum: Arthropoda
- Class: Insecta
- Order: Coleoptera
- Suborder: Polyphaga
- Infraorder: Cucujiformia
- Family: Curculionidae
- Genus: Magdalis
- Species: M. alutacea

Binomial name
- Magdalis alutacea LeConte, 1878

= Magdalis alutacea =

Species of beetle

Magdalis alutacea is a species of wedge-shaped bark weevil in the beetle family Curculionidae. It is found in North America.
