= Bagous magister =

Scientific classification
- Kingdom: Animalia
- Phylum: Arthropoda
- Class: Insecta
- Order: Coleoptera
- Suborder: Polyphaga
- Infraorder: Cucujiformia
- Family: Curculionidae
- Genus: Bagous
- Species: B. magister

Binomial name
- Bagous magister LeConte, 1876

Species of beetle

Bagous magister is a species of snout or bark beetle in the family Curculionidae. It is found in North America.
