= Magdalis pandura =

Scientific classification
- Domain: Eukaryota
- Kingdom: Animalia
- Phylum: Arthropoda
- Class: Insecta
- Order: Coleoptera
- Suborder: Polyphaga
- Infraorder: Cucujiformia
- Family: Curculionidae
- Genus: Magdalis
- Species: M. pandura

Binomial name
- Magdalis pandura (Say, 1831)

Species of beetle

Magdalis pandura is a species of wedge-shaped bark weevil in the beetle family Curculionidae. It is found in North America.
