= Bagous transversus =

Scientific classification
- Kingdom: Animalia
- Phylum: Arthropoda
- Class: Insecta
- Order: Coleoptera
- Suborder: Polyphaga
- Infraorder: Cucujiformia
- Family: Curculionidae
- Genus: Bagous
- Species: B. transversus

Binomial name
- Bagous transversus LeConte, 1876

Synonyms
- Bagous carinatus Blatchley, 1925

Species of beetle

Bagous transversus is a species of beetle in the family Curculionidae. It is found in North America.
