= Magdalis olyra =

Scientific classification
- Kingdom: Animalia
- Phylum: Arthropoda
- Class: Insecta
- Order: Coleoptera
- Suborder: Polyphaga
- Infraorder: Cucujiformia
- Family: Curculionidae
- Genus: Magdalis
- Species: M. olyra

Binomial name
- Magdalis olyra (Herbst, 1797)

Synonyms
- Thamnophilus brunnipes Gyllenhal, 1836

Species of beetle

Magdalis olyra is a species of wedge-shaped bark weevil in the beetle family Curculionidae. It is found in North America.
