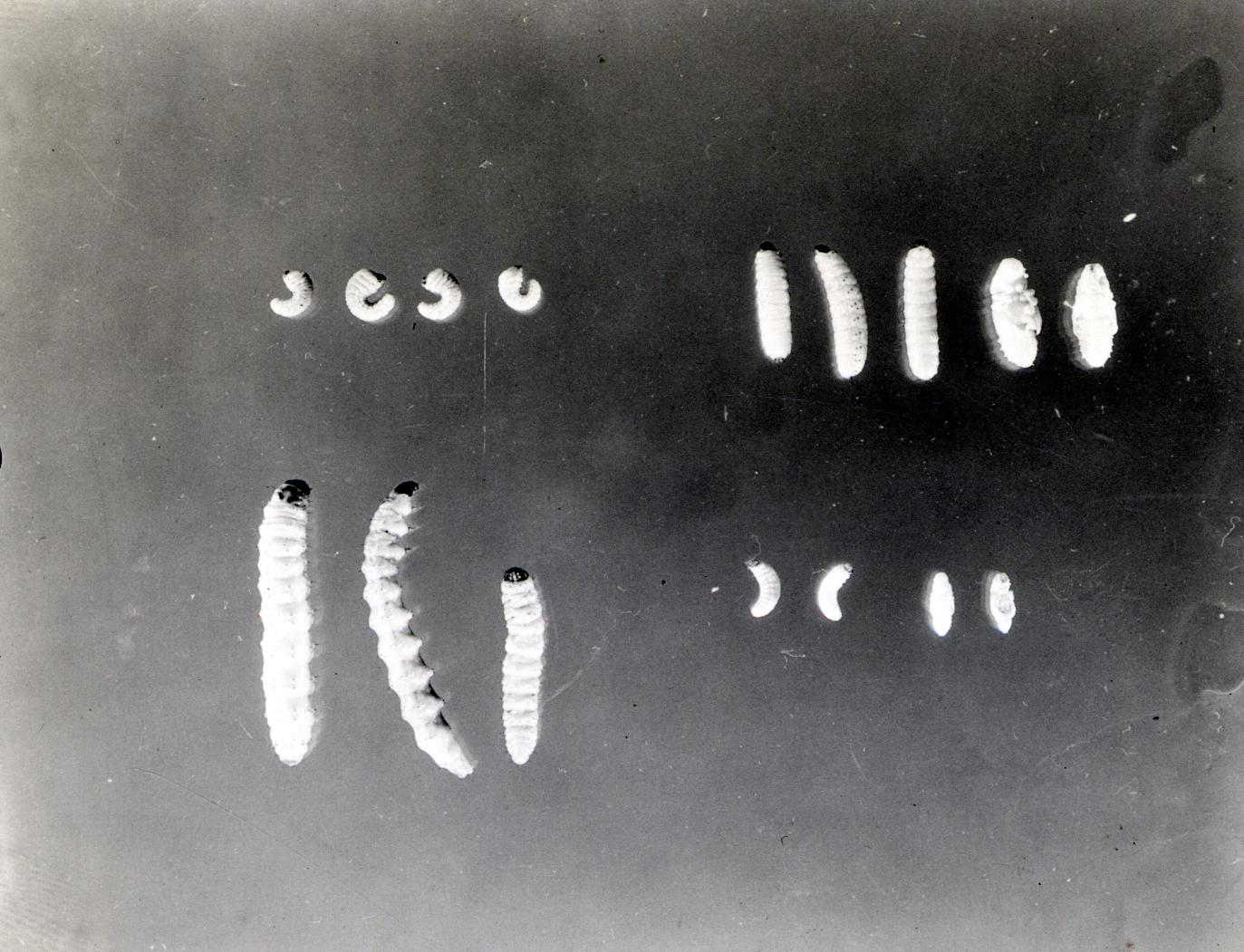

Scientific classification
- Kingdom: Animalia
- Phylum: Arthropoda
- Clade: Pancrustacea
- Class: Insecta
- Order: Coleoptera
- Suborder: Polyphaga
- Infraorder: Cucujiformia
- Superfamily: Curculionoidea
- Family: Curculionidae
- Genus: Magdalis
- Species: M. lecontei

Binomial name
- Magdalis lecontei Horn, 1873

Synonyms
- Magdalis decepta Sleeper, 1955; Magdalis superba Fall, 1913; Magdalis tenebrosa Fall, 1913; Magdalis tinctipennis Fall, 1913

= Magdalis lecontei =

Species of beetle

Magdalis lecontei is a species of wedge-shaped bark weevil in the beetle family Curculionidae. It is found in North America.

== Subspecies ==
These four subspecies belong to the species Magdalis lecontei:

- Magdalis lecontei decepta Sleeper, 1955
- Magdalis lecontei lecontei
- Magdalis lecontei superba
- Magdalis lecontei tinctipennis
