= Magdalis aenescens =

Scientific classification
- Kingdom: Animalia
- Phylum: Arthropoda
- Class: Insecta
- Order: Coleoptera
- Suborder: Polyphaga
- Infraorder: Cucujiformia
- Family: Curculionidae
- Genus: Magdalis
- Species: M. aenescens

Binomial name
- Magdalis aenescens LeConte, 1876

Species of beetle

Magdalis aenescens, the bronze appletree weevil, is a species of wedge-shaped bark weevil in the beetle family Curculionidae. It is found in North America.
