= Bagous americanus =

Scientific classification
- Kingdom: Animalia
- Phylum: Arthropoda
- Class: Insecta
- Order: Coleoptera
- Suborder: Polyphaga
- Infraorder: Cucujiformia
- Family: Curculionidae
- Genus: Bagous
- Species: B. americanus

Binomial name
- Bagous americanus LeConte, 1876

Species of beetle

Bagous americanus is a species of true weevil in the beetle family Curculionidae. It is found in North America. It feeds on Nymphaea odorata, with larvae being leaf miners.
