= Trichomagdalis conspersa =

Scientific classification
- Domain: Eukaryota
- Kingdom: Animalia
- Phylum: Arthropoda
- Class: Insecta
- Order: Coleoptera
- Suborder: Polyphaga
- Infraorder: Cucujiformia
- Family: Curculionidae
- Genus: Trichomagdalis
- Species: T. conspersa

Binomial name
- Trichomagdalis conspersa Fall, 1913

Species of beetle

Trichomagdalis conspersa is a species of wedge-shaped bark weevil in the beetle family Curculionidae. It is found in North America.
