= Magdalis austera =

Scientific classification
- Domain: Eukaryota
- Kingdom: Animalia
- Phylum: Arthropoda
- Class: Insecta
- Order: Coleoptera
- Suborder: Polyphaga
- Infraorder: Cucujiformia
- Family: Curculionidae
- Genus: Magdalis
- Species: M. austera

Binomial name
- Magdalis austera Fall, 1913

Synonyms
- Magdalis substriga Fall, 1913

Species of beetle

Magdalis austera is a species of wedge-shaped bark weevil in the beetle family Curculionidae. It is found in North America.

== Subspecies ==
These two subspecies belong to the species Magdalis austera:

- Magdalis austera austera Fall, 1913
- Magdalis austera substriga Fall, 1913
