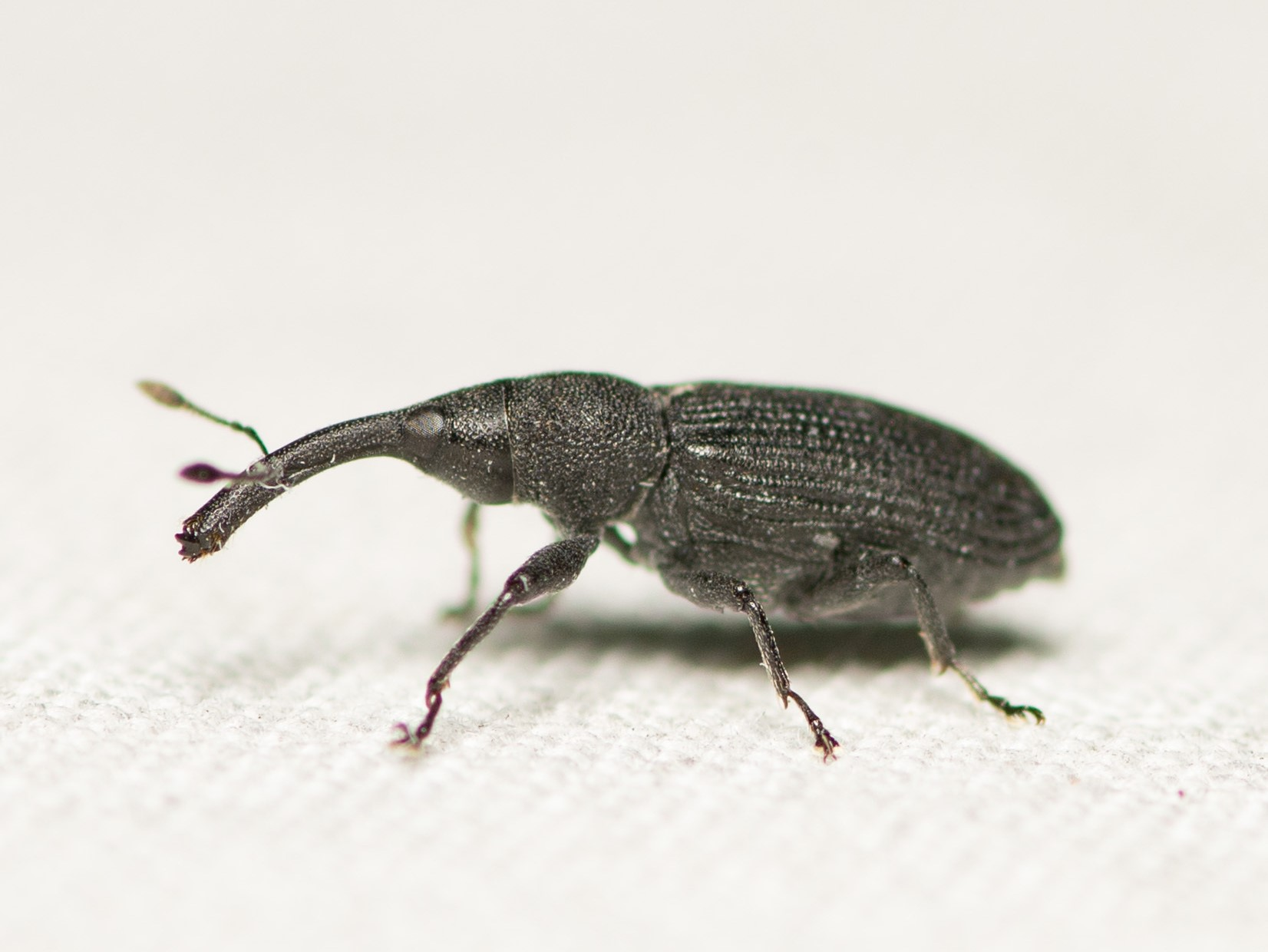

Scientific classification
- Kingdom: Animalia
- Phylum: Arthropoda
- Clade: Pancrustacea
- Class: Insecta
- Order: Coleoptera
- Suborder: Polyphaga
- Infraorder: Cucujiformia
- Family: Curculionidae
- Genus: Magdalis
- Species: M. barbita

Binomial name
- Magdalis barbita (Say, 1831)

= Magdalis barbita =

Species of beetle

Magdalis barbita, commonly known as black elm bark weevil, is a species of wedge-shaped bark weevil in the beetle family Curculionidae.
