= CION =

CION or cion can refer to:

- An alternative spelling of Scion, the upper part of a grafted plant
- CION-FM, a French-language Canadian radio station located in Quebec City, Quebec

== See also ==
- Ciona, a genus of Chordata animals
- Cionodon, a genus of dinosaur from the Late Cretaceous Period
- Cionus, a genus of weevils in family Curculionidae
