= Bagous nodulosus =

Scientific classification
- Kingdom: Animalia
- Phylum: Arthropoda
- Class: Insecta
- Order: Coleoptera
- Suborder: Polyphaga
- Infraorder: Cucujiformia
- Family: Curculionidae
- Genus: Bagous
- Species: B. nodulosus

Binomial name
- Bagous nodulosus Gyllenhal, 1836

Species of beetle

Bagous nodulosus is a species of beetle belonging to the family Curculionidae.

It is native to Europe. Butomus umbellatus is the host plant for the adults, which feed above the water surface. The pupal stage lasts 14 days.

Synonyms:

- Dicranthus nodulosus
- Hydronomus nodulosus
