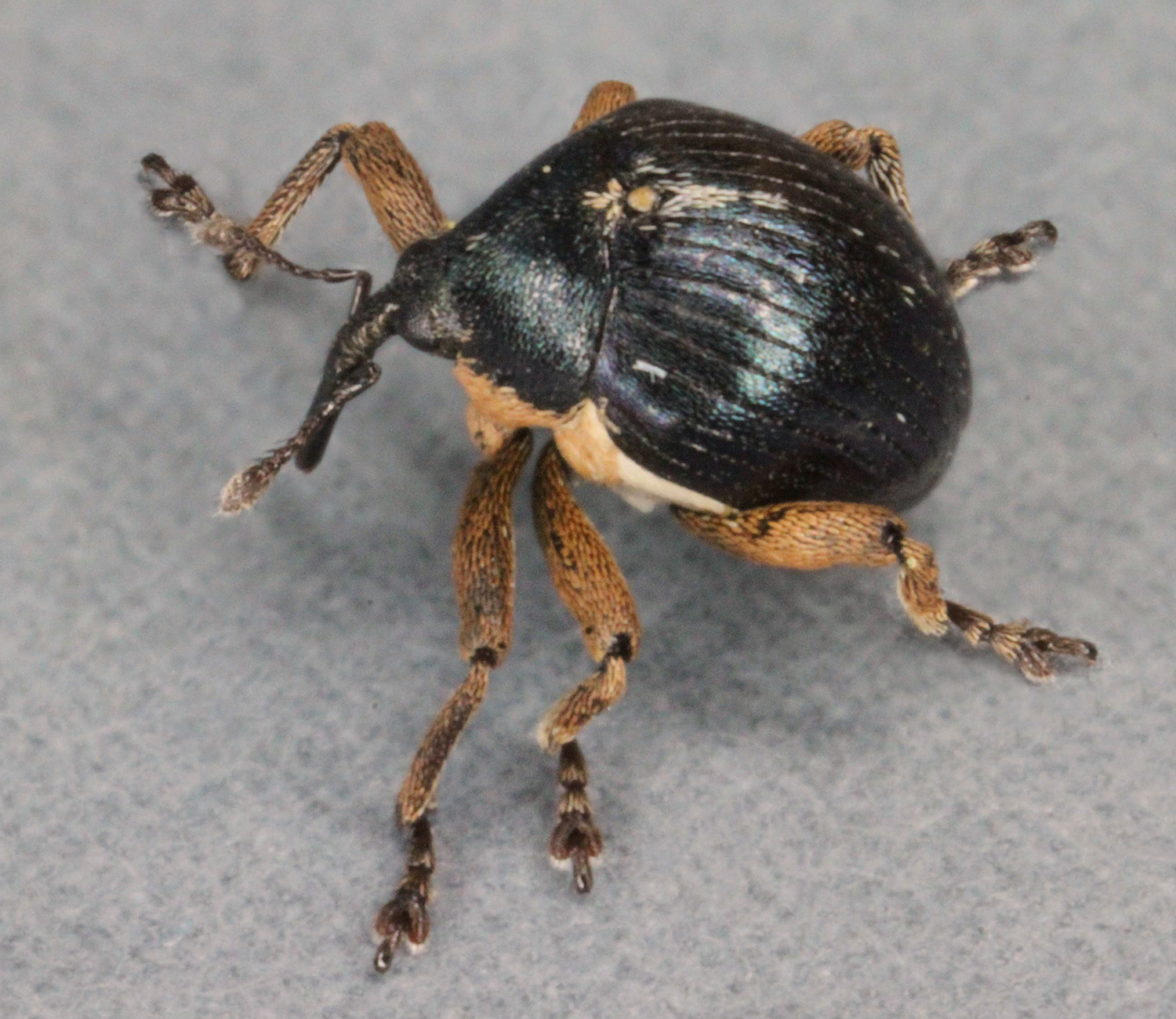
- Orobitis cyaneus, Harlech dunes, North Wales

Scientific classification
- Kingdom: Animalia
- Phylum: Arthropoda
- Class: Insecta
- Order: Coleoptera
- Suborder: Polyphaga
- Infraorder: Cucujiformia
- Family: Curculionidae
- Genus: Orobitis
- Species: O. cyaneus

Binomial name
- Orobitis cyaneus (Linnaeus, 1758)

= Orobitis cyaneus =

Species of beetle

Orobitis cyaneus is a species of weevil native to Europe.
