= Bagous mamillatus =

Scientific classification
- Domain: Eukaryota
- Kingdom: Animalia
- Phylum: Arthropoda
- Class: Insecta
- Order: Coleoptera
- Suborder: Polyphaga
- Infraorder: Cucujiformia
- Family: Curculionidae
- Genus: Bagous
- Species: B. mamillatus

Binomial name
- Bagous mamillatus Say, 1831

Species of beetle

Bagous mamillatus is a species of true weevil in the beetle family Curculionidae. It is found in North America.
