= Bagous restrictus =

Scientific classification
- Domain: Eukaryota
- Kingdom: Animalia
- Phylum: Arthropoda
- Class: Insecta
- Order: Coleoptera
- Suborder: Polyphaga
- Infraorder: Cucujiformia
- Family: Curculionidae
- Genus: Bagous
- Species: B. restrictus

Binomial name
- Bagous restrictus LeConte, 1876

Species of beetle

Bagous restrictus is a species of true weevil in the beetle family Curculionidae. It is found in North America. The non-native invasive species Hydrilla is the only known host plant for this beetle, with larvae feeding on and developing within Hydrilla stems.
