= Magdalis armicollis =

Scientific classification
- Kingdom: Animalia
- Phylum: Arthropoda
- Class: Insecta
- Order: Coleoptera
- Suborder: Polyphaga
- Infraorder: Cucujiformia
- Family: Curculionidae
- Genus: Magdalis
- Species: M. armicollis

Binomial name
- Magdalis armicollis (Say, 1824)

Synonyms
- Thamnophilus pallidus Say, 1831

Species of beetle

Magdalis armicollis, the red elm bark weevil, is a species of wedge-shaped bark weevil in the beetle family Curculionidae. It is found in North America. Larvae live within the wood of Ulmus trees while the adults feed on leaves.
