= Pnigodes =

Scientific classification
- Kingdom: Animalia
- Phylum: Arthropoda
- Clade: Pancrustacea
- Class: Insecta
- Order: Coleoptera
- Suborder: Polyphaga
- Infraorder: Cucujiformia
- Family: Curculionidae
- Subfamily: Bagoinae
- Genus: Pnigodes; LeConte, 1876

Genus of beetles

Pnigodes is a genus of true weevils in the beetle family Curculionidae. There is at least one described species in Pnigodes, P. setosus.
