= Laemosaccus texanus =

Scientific classification
- Domain: Eukaryota
- Kingdom: Animalia
- Phylum: Arthropoda
- Class: Insecta
- Order: Coleoptera
- Suborder: Polyphaga
- Infraorder: Cucujiformia
- Family: Curculionidae
- Genus: Laemosaccus
- Species: L. texanus

Binomial name
- Laemosaccus texanus Champion, 1903

Species of beetle

Laemosaccus texanus is a species of true weevil in the beetle family Curculionidae. It is found in North America.
