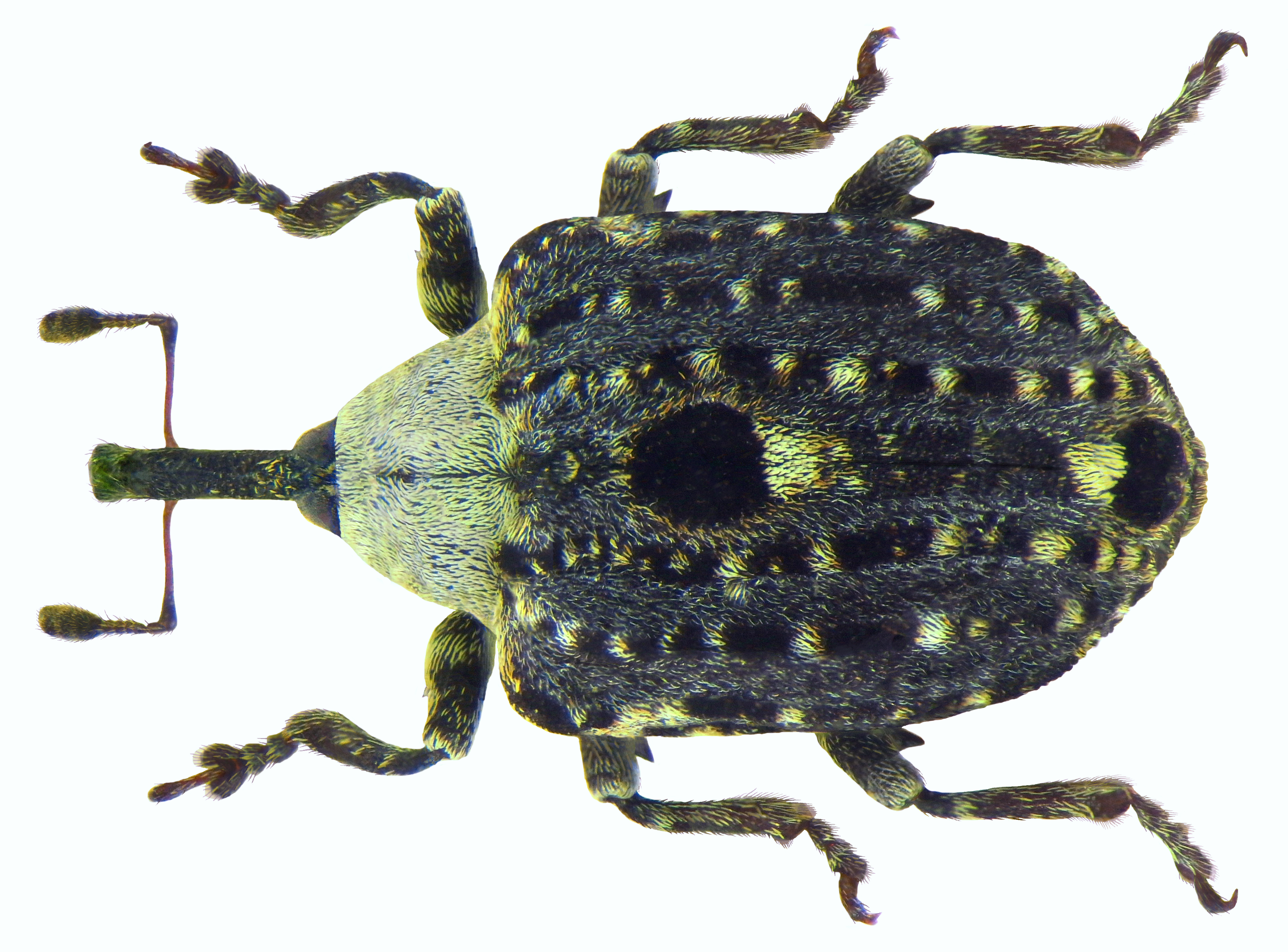

Scientific classification
- Kingdom: Animalia
- Phylum: Arthropoda
- Class: Insecta
- Order: Coleoptera
- Suborder: Polyphaga
- Infraorder: Cucujiformia
- Family: Curculionidae
- Genus: Cionus
- Species: C. scrophulariae

Binomial name
- Cionus scrophulariae (Linnaeus, 1758)

= Cionus scrophulariae =

Species of beetle

Cionus scrophulariae, commonly known as the figwort weevil is a species of weevil native to Europe.
