= Neomagdalis =

Scientific classification
- Domain: Eukaryota
- Kingdom: Animalia
- Phylum: Arthropoda
- Class: Insecta
- Order: Coleoptera
- Suborder: Polyphaga
- Infraorder: Cucujiformia
- Family: Curculionidae
- Genus: Neomagdalis; Kuschel, 1950

Genus of insects

Neomagdalis is a genus of beetles belonging to the family Curculionidae.

Species:

- Neomagdalis cana Kuschel, 1950
- Neomagdalis luteipennis Hustache, 1937
- Neomagdalis unicolor Hustache, 1937
