= Laemosaccus =

Scientific classification
- Kingdom: Animalia
- Phylum: Arthropoda
- Class: Insecta
- Order: Coleoptera
- Suborder: Polyphaga
- Infraorder: Cucujiformia
- Family: Curculionidae
- Subfamily: Mesoptiliinae
- Genus: Laemosaccus; Schönherr, 1823

Diversity
- at least 130 species

Genus of beetles

Laemosaccus is a genus of true weevils in the beetle family Curculionidae. There are at least 130 described species in Laemosaccus.

== See also ==
- List of Laemosaccus species
