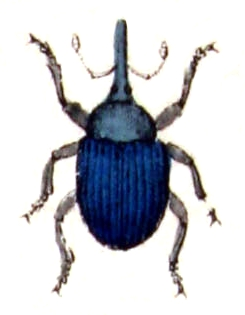
- Orobitis cyanea

Scientific classification
- Domain: Eukaryota
- Kingdom: Animalia
- Phylum: Arthropoda
- Class: Insecta
- Order: Coleoptera
- Suborder: Polyphaga
- Infraorder: Cucujiformia
- Family: Curculionidae
- Genus: Orobitis; Germar, 1817

= Orobitis =

Genus of beetles

Orobitis is a genus of beetles belonging to the family Curculionidae.

The species of this genus are found in Europe.

Selected species:

- Orobitis altus Germar, 1824
- Orobitis anceps Germar, 1824
- Orobitis cyaneus (Linnaeus, 1758)
