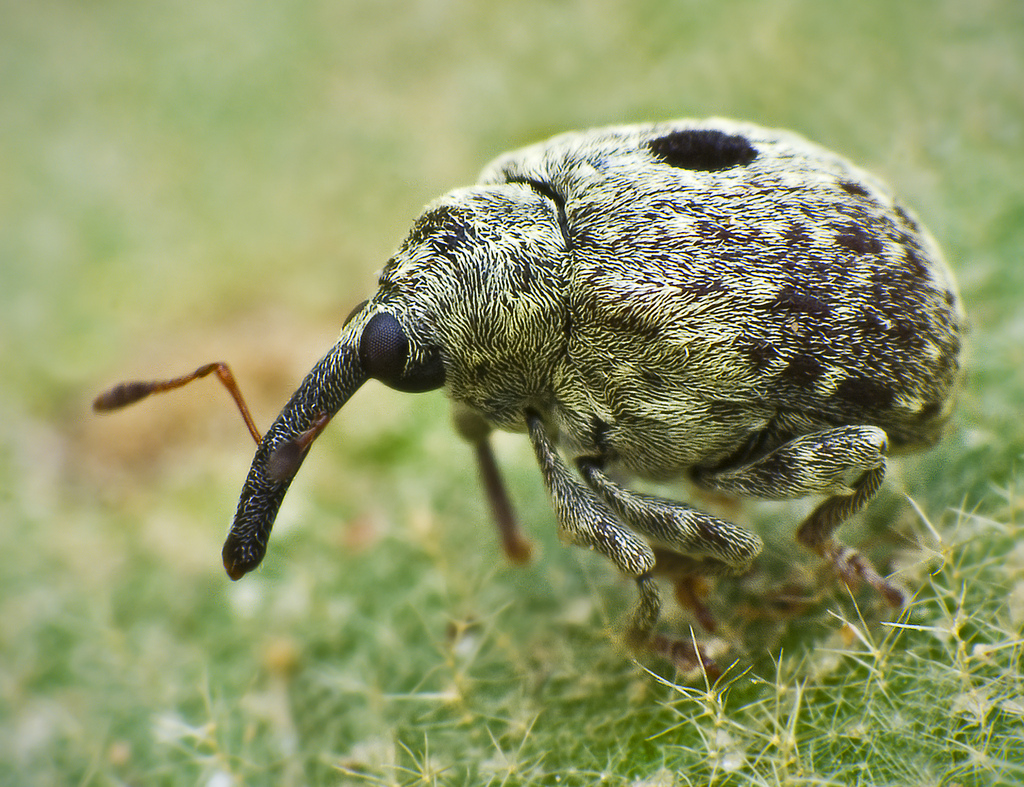
- Cionus hortulanus

Scientific classification
- Domain: Eukaryota
- Kingdom: Animalia
- Phylum: Arthropoda
- Class: Insecta
- Order: Coleoptera
- Suborder: Polyphaga
- Infraorder: Cucujiformia
- Family: Curculionidae
- Tribe: Cionini
- Genus: Cionus; Clairville, 1798

Species
- See text

= Cionus =

Genus of weevils

Cionus is a genus of weevils.

== Species ==
- Cionus alauda
- Cionus albidus
- Cionus albopubens
- Cionus albopunctatus
- Cionus albosparsus
- Cionus alluaudi
- Cionus amictus
- Cionus angulicollis
- Cionus antirrhini
- Cionus asellus
- Cionus atlanticus
- Cionus auriculus
- Cionus batianii
- Cionus beccabungae
- Cionus bipunctatus
- Cionus bipustulatus
- Cionus blattariae
- Cionus bulgaricus
- Cionus campanulae
- Cionus canariensis
- Cionus capensis
- Cionus caprimulgus
- Cionus catenatus
- Cionus caucasicus
- Cionus championi
- Cionus clairvillei
- Cionus compactus
- Cionus congoanus
- Cionus coriaceus
- Cionus costipennis
- Cionus decorus
- Cionus densenotatus
- Cionus dependens
- Cionus distinctus
- Cionus donckieri
- Cionus elegantulus
- Cionus ferrugans
- Cionus ferrugatus
- Cionus flavocalcaratus
- Cionus flavoguttatus
- Cionus flavopunctatus
- Cionus fraxini
- Cionus galanus
- Cionus galloisi
- Cionus ganglbaueri
- Cionus gebleri
- Cionus gibbifrons
- Cionus globulariae
- Cionus globulus
- Cionus goricus
- Cionus graminis
- Cionus griseopubens
- Cionus griseus
- Cionus hauseri
- Cionus helleri
- Cionus hemisphaericus
- Cionus histrio
- Cionus hortulanus
- Cionus hypsibatus
- Cionus impunctatus
- Cionus indicus
- Cionus ingratus
- Cionus interruptus
- Cionus japonicus
- Cionus kunzii
- Cionus labilis
- Cionus leonhardi
- Cionus leucostictus
- Cionus linariae
- Cionus longicollis
- Cionus luctuosus
- Cionus lythri
- Cionus melanarius
- Cionus meleagris
- Cionus merkli
- Cionus meticulatus
- Cionus meticulosus
- Cionus micros
- Cionus moestus
- Cionus montanus
- Cionus netus
- Cionus nigritarsis
- Cionus nigropunctatus
- Cionus noctis
- Cionus notatus
- Cionus nubilosus
- Cionus obesus
- Cionus obscurus
- Cionus ocellatus
- Cionus ochraceus
- Cionus ogasawarai
- Cionus olens
- Cionus olivieri
- Cionus orientalis
- Cionus osyridis
- Cionus pallidulus
- Cionus pallidus
- Cionus parcenotatus
- Cionus pardus
- Cionus pascuorum
- Cionus perlatus
- Cionus pici
- Cionus pictus
- Cionus plantarum
- Cionus ponticus
- Cionus pulchellus
- Cionus pulvereus
- Cionus pulverosus
- Cionus pustulatus
- Cionus rostellum
- Cionus salicariae
- Cionus schoenherri
- Cionus schrophulariae
- Cionus schultzei
- Cionus scrophulariae
- Cionus semialbellus
- Cionus setiger
- Cionus similis
- Cionus simplex
- Cionus solani
- Cionus solanus
- Cionus spilotus
- Cionus spinosulus
- Cionus stimulosus
- Cionus subalpinus
- Cionus subsquamosus
- Cionus suturalis
- Cionus tamazo
- Cionus tarsalis
- Cionus telonensis
- Cionus teter
- Cionus thapsi
- Cionus thapsicola
- Cionus thapsus
- Cionus thaspi
- Cionus thoracicus
- Cionus tieffenbachi
- Cionus tissoni
- Cionus tonkinensis
- Cionus transquamosus
- Cionus trionatus
- Cionus tristis
- Cionus tuberculosus
- Cionus tuberosus
- Cionus ulmi
- Cionus ungulatus
- Cionus uniformis
- Cionus usambicus
- Cionus variegatus
- Cionus verbasci
- Cionus veronicae
- Cionus vestitus
- Cionus villae
- Cionus virgatus
- Cionus wanati
- Cionus wittei
- Cionus woodi
