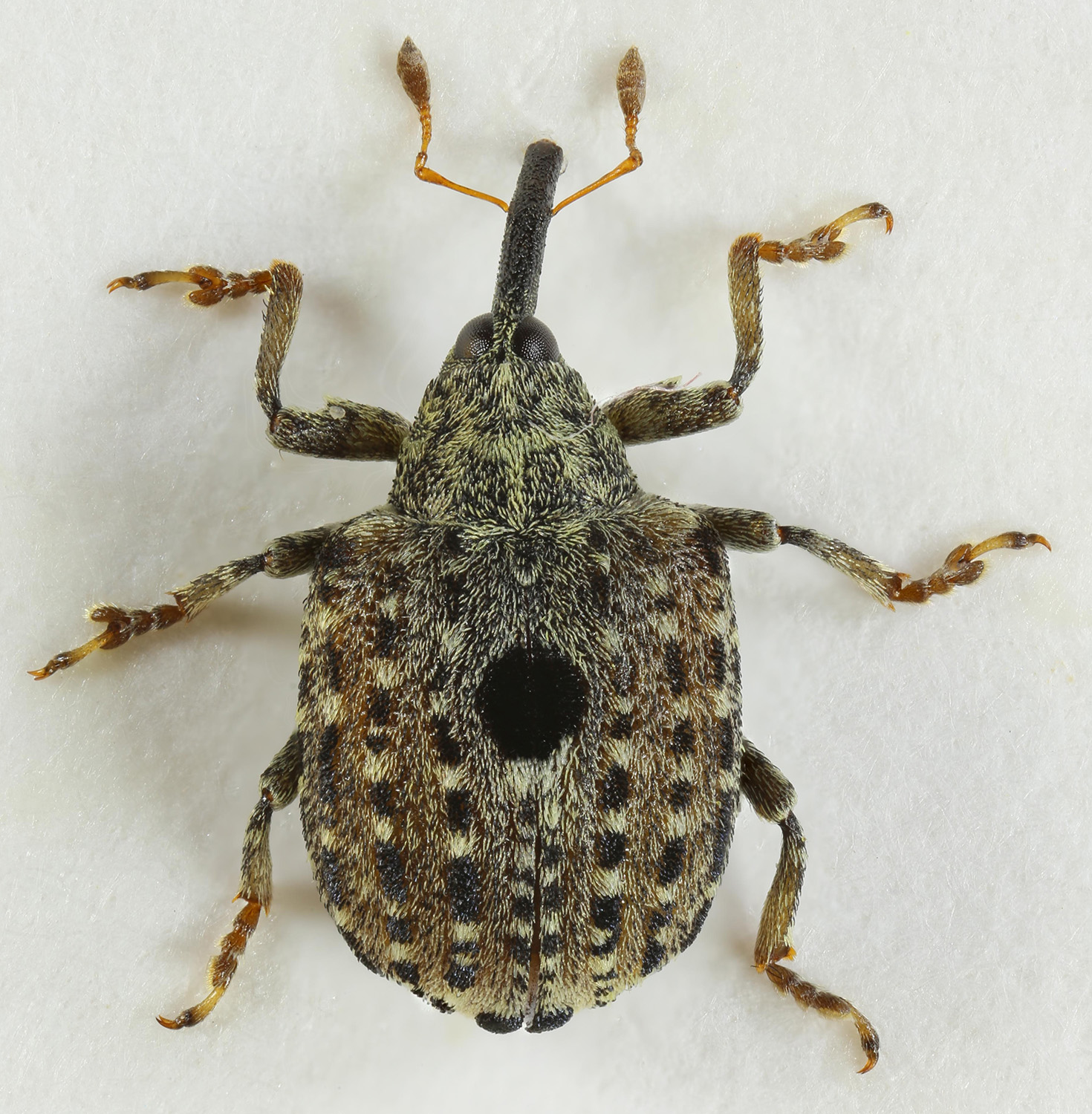
- Cionus hortulanus. Dorsal view
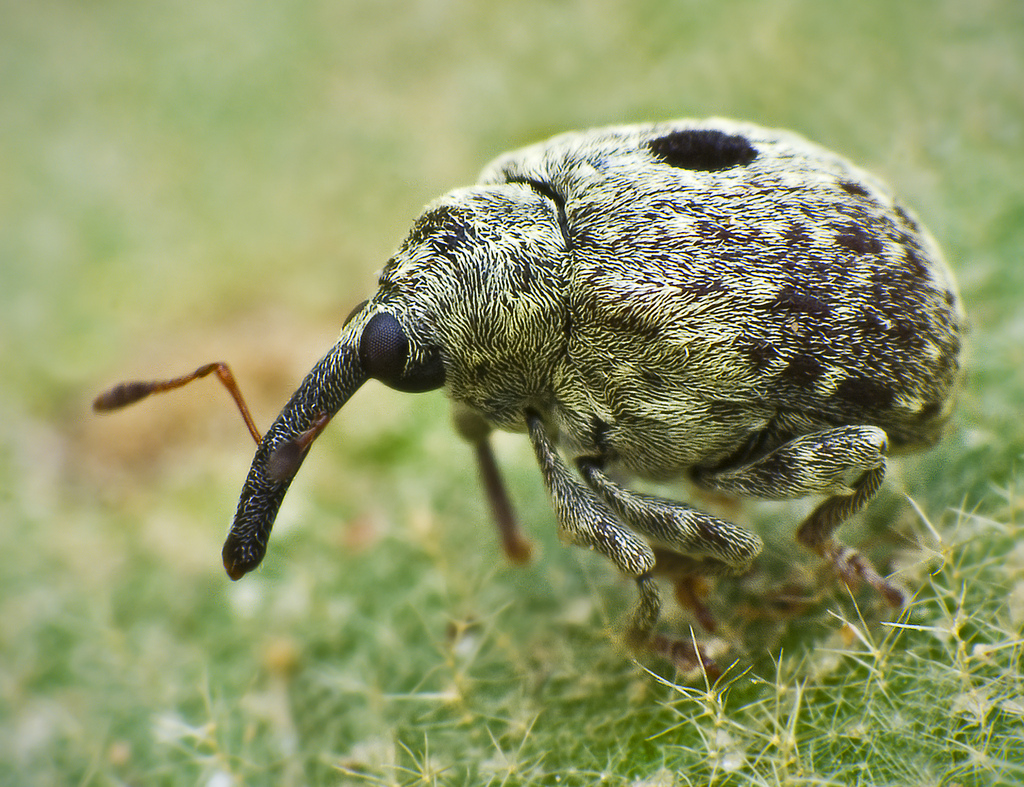
- Side view

Scientific classification
- Kingdom: Animalia
- Phylum: Arthropoda
- Clade: Pancrustacea
- Class: Insecta
- Order: Coleoptera
- Suborder: Polyphaga
- Infraorder: Cucujiformia
- Superfamily: Curculionoidea
- Family: Curculionidae
- Genus: Cionus
- Species: C. hortulanus

Binomial name
- Cionus hortulanus (Fourcroy, 1785)

= Cionus hortulanus =

Species of beetle

Cionus hortulanus is a species of weevils belonging to the family Curculionidae, subfamily Curculioninae.

== Etymology ==
The genus name Cionus derives from the Greek kíonos, meaning column, with reference to the shape of the snout. The Latin species name hortulanus means garden warden.

== Distribution and habitat ==
This species is present in most of Europe, in NW Africa, the Caucasus, Asia Minor, Iran, Siberia, Central Asia and India. These beetles mainly inhabit meadows and hedge rows.

== Description ==
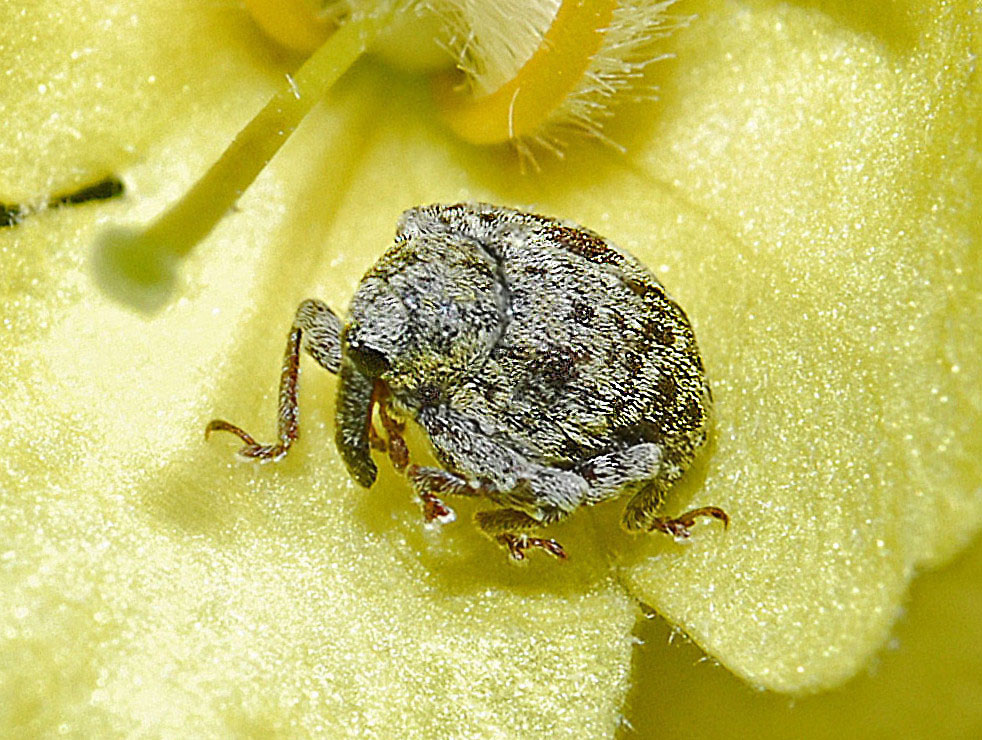
Feeding on Verbascum

Cionus hortulanus can reach a length of 3–4.6 millimetres (0.12–0.18 in). These tiny beetles have a short, oblong and convex body, a conical thorax and a long thin rostrum. Thorax and elytra are covered with grey scales.

The basic body color is grey-brown, with one large velvety black spot in the middle of the elytra and a smaller one at the apex. The elytra bears four raised lines with a series of black markings. The antennae are reddish.

== Biology ==
Adults of these beetles can be found from June to September. They feed on leaves of Buddleja and Verbascum species, while larvae feed on Water Figwort (Scrophularia auriculata), Common Figwort (Scrophularia nodosa) and Great Mullein (Verbascum thapsus). Females lay eggs on leaves of the host plants.
