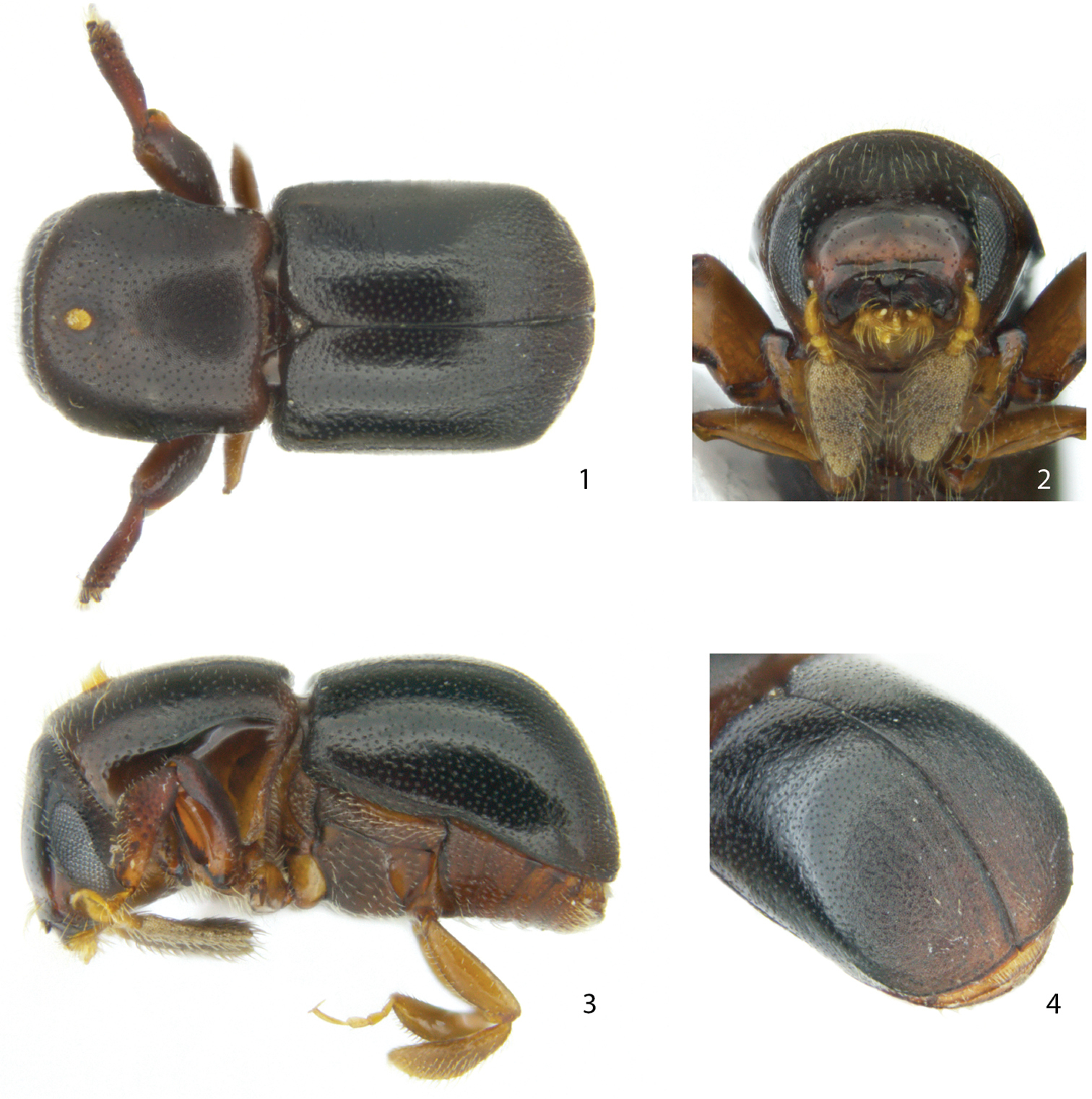
- Scolytoplatypus unipilus, the smallest known species of the genus

Scientific classification
- Kingdom: Animalia
- Phylum: Arthropoda
- Class: Insecta
- Order: Coleoptera
- Suborder: Polyphaga
- Infraorder: Cucujiformia
- Family: Curculionidae
- Genus: Scolytoplatypus; Schaufuss, 1891

Diversity
- About 47+ species

= Scolytoplatypus =

Genus of beetles

Scolytoplatypus is a genus of beetles belonging to the family Curculionidae. The genus contains about 47 to 50 species worldwide. In Asia, 29 species known, 11 or 12 are known in African continent and 7 species in Madagascar.

Males and females are strongly dimorphic. Male frons distinctly concave as opposed to the convex female frons. Asian species can be easily separated from African counterparts by having sexually dimorphic antennae.

== Species ==
- Scolytoplatypus acuminatus
- Scolytoplatypus africanus
- Scolytoplatypus armatus
- Scolytoplatypus blandfordi
- Scolytoplatypus brahma
- Scolytoplatypus calvus
- Scolytoplatypus cirratus
- Scolytoplatypus congonus
- Scolytoplatypus curviciliosus
- Scolytoplatypus eichelbaumi
- Scolytoplatypus exiguus
- Scolytoplatypus daimio
- Scolytoplatypus darjeelingi
- Scolytoplatypus fasciatus
- Scolytoplatypus gardneri
- Scolytoplatypus hova
- Scolytoplatypus kivuensis
- Scolytoplatypus kunala
- Scolytoplatypus lopchuensis
- Scolytoplatypus luzonicus
- Scolytoplatypus macgregori
- Scolytoplatypus mikado
- Scolytoplatypus minimus
- Scolytoplatypus mutabilis
- Scolytoplatypus neglectus
- Scolytoplatypus nitidicollis
- Scolytoplatypus obtectus
- Scolytoplatypus occidentalis
- Scolytoplatypus opacicollis
- Scolytoplatypus permirus
- Scolytoplatypus pubescens
- Scolytoplatypus raja
- Scolytoplatypus ruficauda
- Scolytoplatypus rugosus
- Scolytoplatypus samsinghensis
- Scolytoplatypus shogun
- Scolytoplatypus supercilliosus
- Scolytoplatypus truncatus
- Scolytoplatypus unipilus
- Scolytoplatypus uter
- Scolytoplatypus zahradniki
