= Trichomagdalis =

Scientific classification
- Domain: Eukaryota
- Kingdom: Animalia
- Phylum: Arthropoda
- Class: Insecta
- Order: Coleoptera
- Suborder: Polyphaga
- Infraorder: Cucujiformia
- Family: Curculionidae
- Tribe: Magdalidini
- Genus: Trichomagdalis; Fall, 1913

Genus of beetles

Trichomagdalis is a genus of wedge-shaped bark weevils in the beetle family Curculionidae. There are about six described species in Trichomagdalis.

== Species ==
These six species belong to the genus Trichomagdalis:

- Trichomagdalis atrata Fall, 1913
- Trichomagdalis atratus Fall, 1913
- Trichomagdalis conspersa Fall, 1913
- Trichomagdalis conspersus Fall, 1913
- Trichomagdalis fasciata Fall, 1913
- Trichomagdalis fasciatus Fall, 1913
