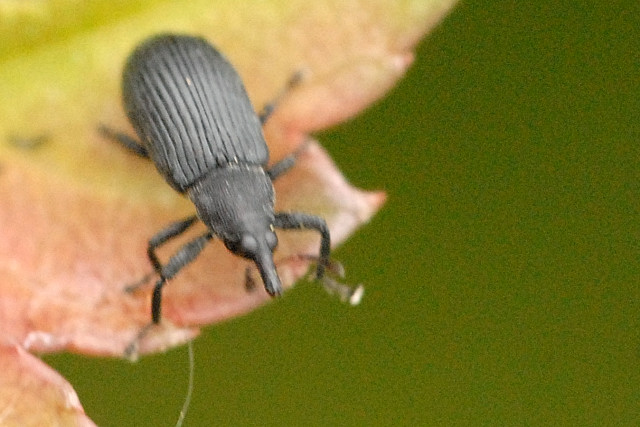
- Magdalis ruficornis

Scientific classification
- Domain: Eukaryota
- Kingdom: Animalia
- Phylum: Arthropoda
- Class: Insecta
- Order: Coleoptera
- Suborder: Polyphaga
- Infraorder: Cucujiformia
- Family: Curculionidae
- Tribe: Magdalidini
- Genus: Magdalis

= Magdalis =

Genus of beetles

Magdalis is a genus of wedge-shaped bark weevils in the family Curculionidae. There are at least 20 described species in Magdalis.

== Species ==
- Magdalis aenescens LeConte, 1876 (bronze appletree weevil)
- Magdalis alutacea LeConte, 1878
- Magdalis armicollis (Say, 1824) (red elm bark weevil)
- Magdalis austera Fall, 1913
- Magdalis barbicornis (Latreille, 1804)
- Magdalis barbita (Say, 1831) (black elm bark weevil)
- Magdalis convexicollis Fall, 1913
- Magdalis cuneiformis Horn, 1873
- Magdalis gentilis LeConte, 1876
- Magdalis gracilis (LeConte, 1857)
- Magdalis hispoides LeConte, 1876
- Magdalis hockingensis Sleeper, 1955
- Magdalis imbellis (LeConte, 1857)
- Magdalis inconspicua Horn, 1873
- Magdalis lecontei Horn, 1873
- Magdalis morio Fall, 1913
- Magdalis olyra (Herbst, 1797)
- Magdalis pandura (Say, 1831)
- Magdalis perforata Horn, 1873
- Magdalis piceae Buchanan, 1934
- Magdalis proxima Fall, 1913
- Magdalis salicis Horn, 1873
- Magdalis striata Fall, 1913
- Magdalis subtincta LeConte, 1876
- Magdalis vitiosa Fall, 1913
