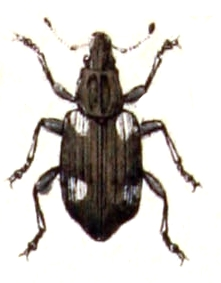
- Bagous lutulentus

Scientific classification
- Kingdom: Animalia
- Phylum: Arthropoda
- Clade: Pancrustacea
- Class: Insecta
- Order: Coleoptera
- Suborder: Polyphaga
- Infraorder: Cucujiformia
- Superfamily: Curculionoidea
- Family: Curculionidae
- Subfamily: Bagoinae

Genera
- See text

= Bagoinae =

Subfamily of beetles

Bagoinae is a weevil subfamily in the family Curculionidae. It is sometimes classified in Molytinae.

== Genera and Species ==
- Bagous
- Hydronomidius
  - Hydronomidius molitor
  - Hydronomidius punjabensis
- Hydronoplus
  - Hydronoplus signatifrons
- Neoephimeropus
  - Neoephimeropus elegantulus
- Picia
  - Picia alfierii
  - Picia caucasica
  - Picia drurei
  - Picia druriei
  - Picia ephimeropoides
  - Picia mesopotamica
  - Picia millingi
- Pnigodes
- Pseudobagous
  - Pseudobagous junodi
  - Pseudobagous longulus
- Sclerolophus
  - Sclerolophus collinus
