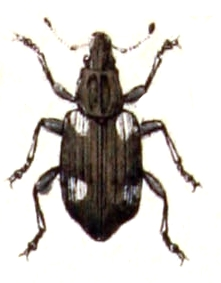
- Bagous lutulentus

Scientific classification
- Domain: Eukaryota
- Kingdom: Animalia
- Phylum: Arthropoda
- Class: Insecta
- Order: Coleoptera
- Suborder: Polyphaga
- Infraorder: Cucujiformia
- Family: Curculionidae
- Subfamily: Bagoinae
- Genus: Bagous; Germar, 1817

Synonyms
- Dicranthus Motschulsky, 1845; Hydronomus Schoenherr, 1825

= Bagous =

Genus of beetles

Bagous is a genus of snout and bark beetles in the family Curculionidae. There are at least 360 described species in Bagous.

== See also ==
- List of Bagous species
