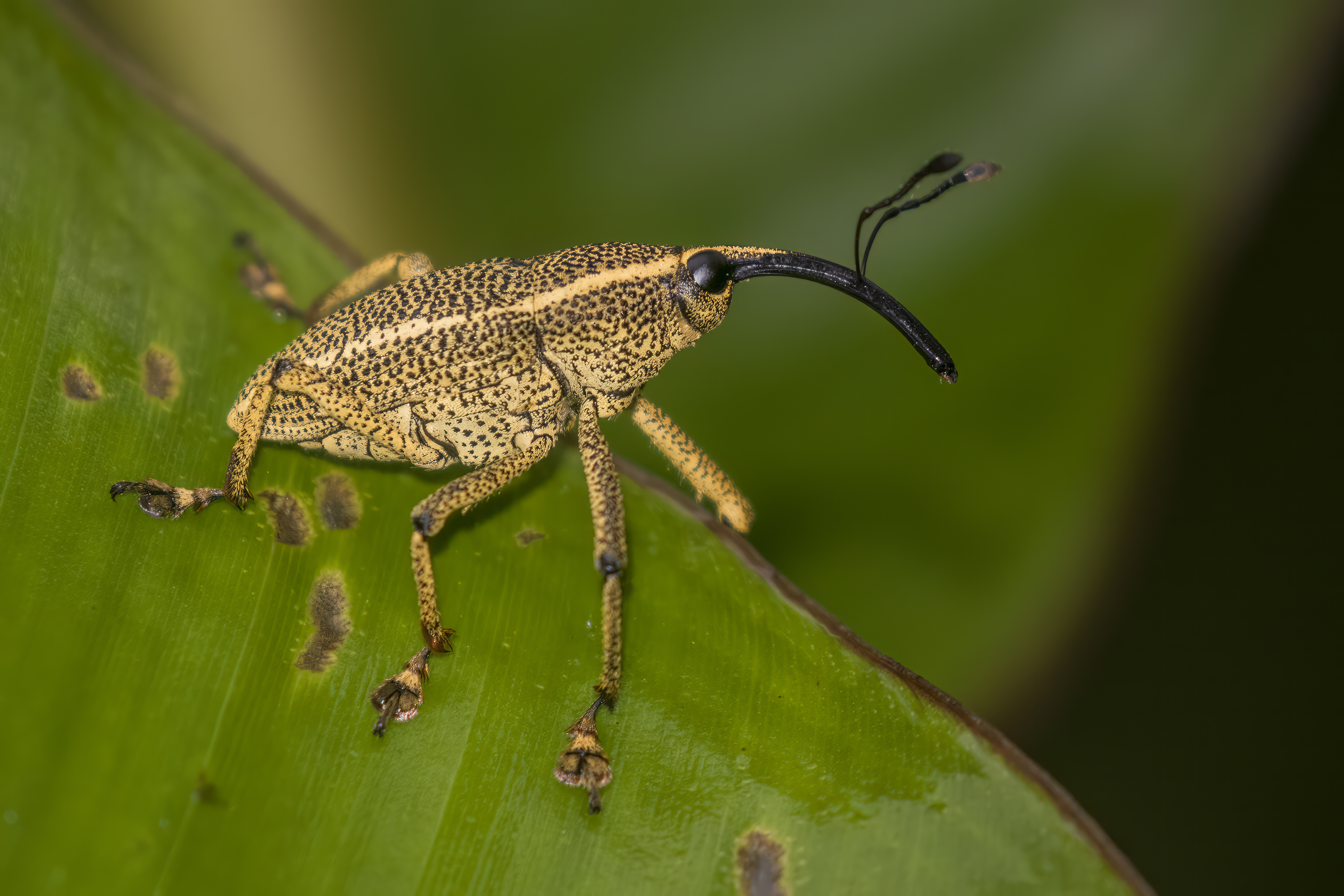
- Cholus cinctus, Panama

Scientific classification
- Kingdom: Animalia
- Phylum: Arthropoda
- Clade: Pancrustacea
- Class: Insecta
- Order: Coleoptera
- Suborder: Polyphaga
- Infraorder: Cucujiformia
- Clade: Phytophaga
- Superfamily: Curculionoidea
- Family: Curculionidae; Latreille, 1802

Diversity
- Some 20 subfamilies (see text)

= Curculionidae =

True weevils and bark beetles

Family of beetles

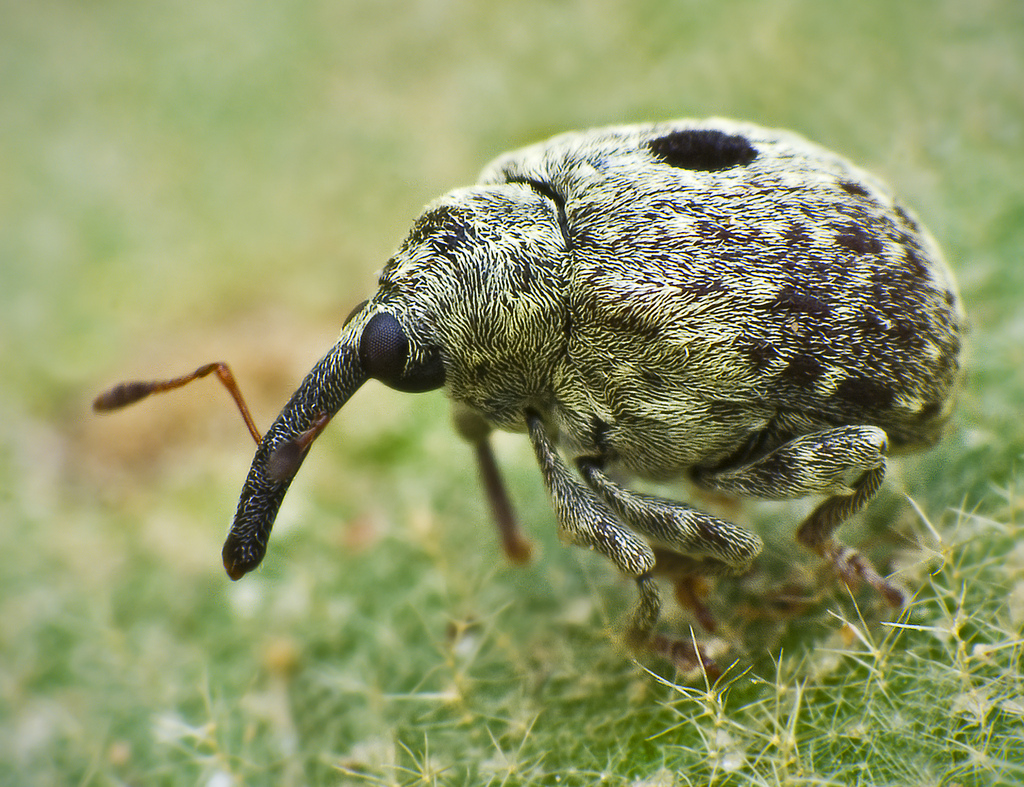
Cionus hortulanus

The Curculionidae are a family of weevils, commonly called snout beetles or true weevils. At the present state of documentation, they are the largest animal family with approximately 6,000 genera and 77,000 species described worldwide. They are the sister group to the family Brentidae.

They include the bark beetles as the subfamily Scolytinae, which are modified in shape in accordance with their wood-boring lifestyle. They do not much resemble other weevils, so they were traditionally considered a distinct family, Scolytidae. The family also includes the ambrosia beetles, of which the present-day subfamily Platypodinae was formerly considered the distinct family Platypodidae.

== Description ==
Adult Curculionidae can be recognised by the well-developed, downwards-curved snout (rostrum) possessed by many species, though the rostrum is sometimes short (e.g. Entiminae). They have elbowed antennae that end in clubs, and the first antennal segment often fits into a groove in the side of the rostrum. The body tends to be robust, convex, heavily sclerotised and covered in scales or bristles. Curculionidae range in size from 1–35 mm long, usually being 5–15 mm long. Most Curculionidae are sexually dimorphic with females (compared to males) having antennae positioned more basally and a longer, thinner rostrum.

Larval Curculionidae are C-shaped and lightly sclerotised, with minute antennae, robust mandibles and no legs.

Most weevils feed on plants as larvae and adults, and they include important pests of cultivated plants that chew holes in fruits, nuts and other parts. The long rostrum possessed by most adult weevils is used by females to help lay eggs (oviposit) inside plant tissue. Some feed on rotten wood or bark (e.g. Cossoninae and Cryptorhynchinae), and some are wood-borers that feed on ambrosia fungi (Platypodinae and some Scolytinae).

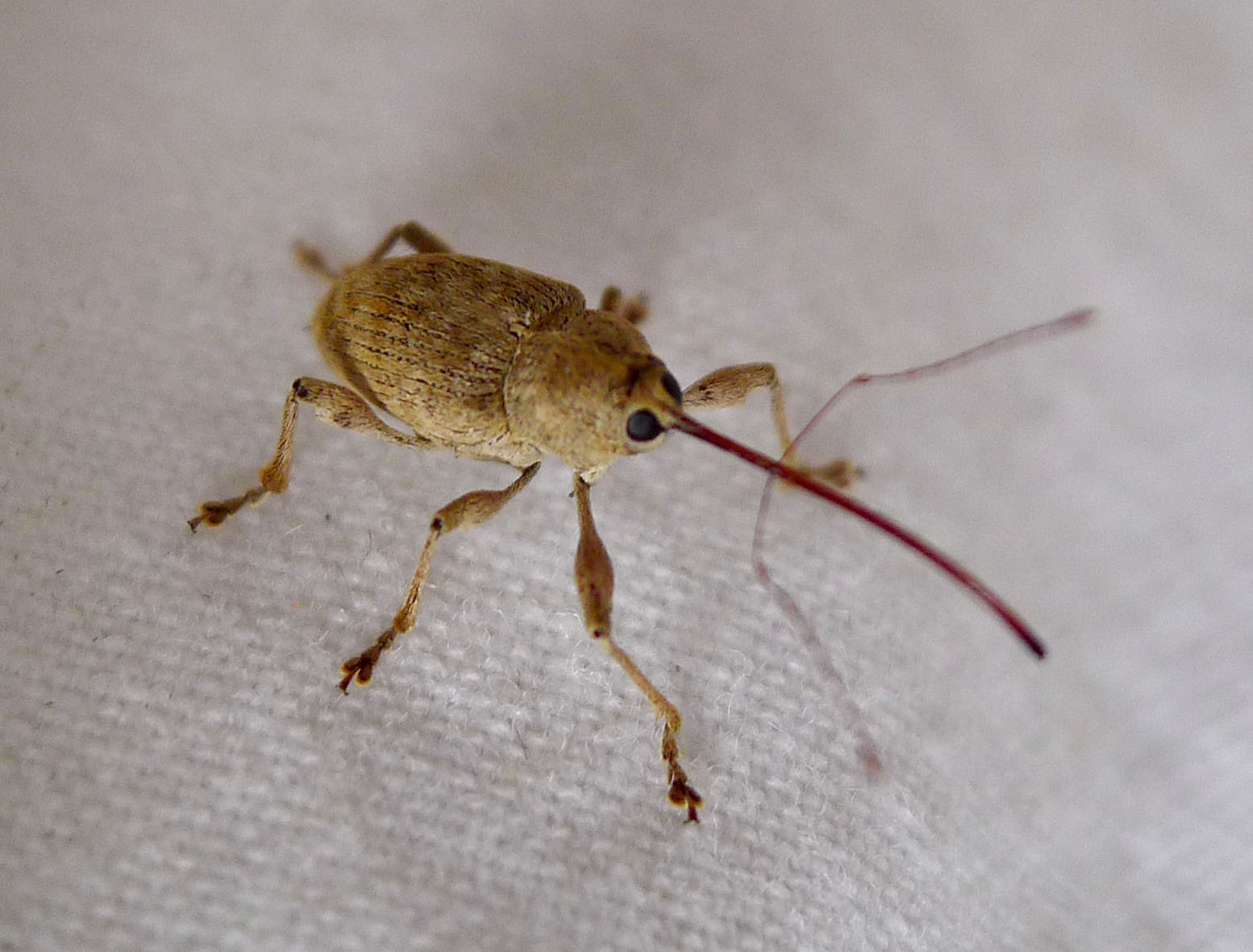
Curculio elephas

Although pesticide resistance hasn't historically been an issue with these insects, recently a mutation was discovered in association with the voltage-gated sodium channel in the species Sitophilus zeamais, indicating there is a lot to learn about how these insects adapt to changing environments.

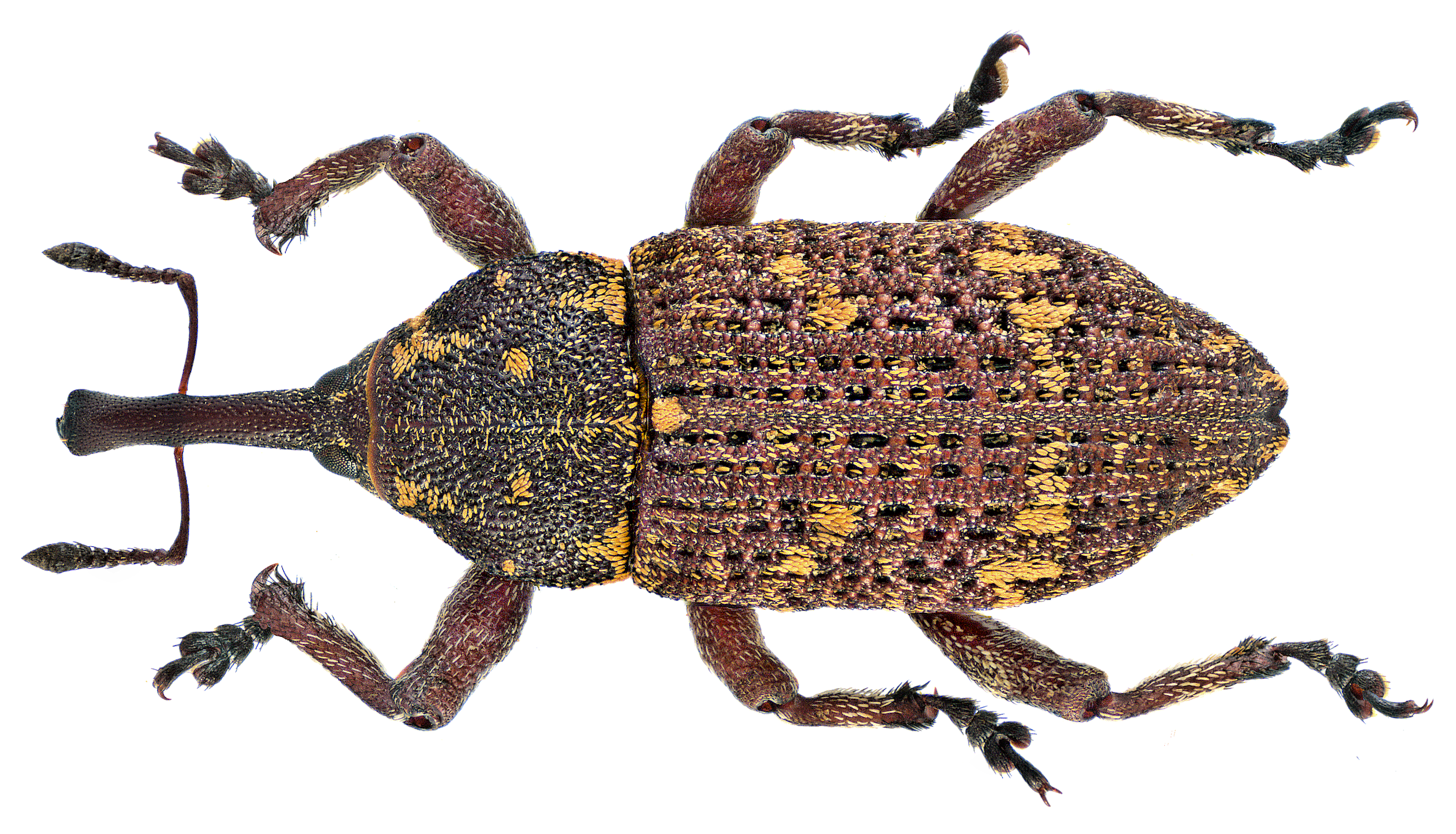
Pissodes pini

== Behavior ==
When disturbed, adult curculionids often play dead by lying motionless on their backs.

Many species of weevils are common household and garden pests, but don't harm people, pets, or buildings. Their presence is more of a temporary nuisance, usually to plants and their fruits in their larval stage. In tropical areas they have larger effects, specifically several species in the genera Conotrachelus and Copturus.

== Phylogeny and systematics ==
The phylogeny of the group is complex; with so many species, a spirited debate exists about the relationships between subfamilies and genera. A 1997 analysis attempted to construct a phylogeny based mainly on larval characteristics.

Recent work on the phylogenetic relationships in weevils mentions the two subfamily groups Adelognatha (short-nosed weevils, subfamily Entiminae) and Phanerognatha (long-nosed weevils, subfamilies of Curculionidae other than Entiminae) for the species of Curculionidae.

Almost two dozen subfamilies are recognized by some authors even when merging those that are certainly invalid. Others, however, recognize a lesser number – the only subfamilies that are almost universally considered valid are the Baridinae, Cossoninae, Curculioninae, Cyclominae, Entiminae, Molytinae, Platypodinae, and Scolytinae. The various proposed taxonomic schemes typically recognize as many additional subfamilies again, but little agreement is seen between authorities about which. In particular, the delimitation of the Molytinae has proven difficult.

The timeline for current and extant weevil speciation and diversification is consistent with the radiation of gymnosperms during the Mesozoic period.

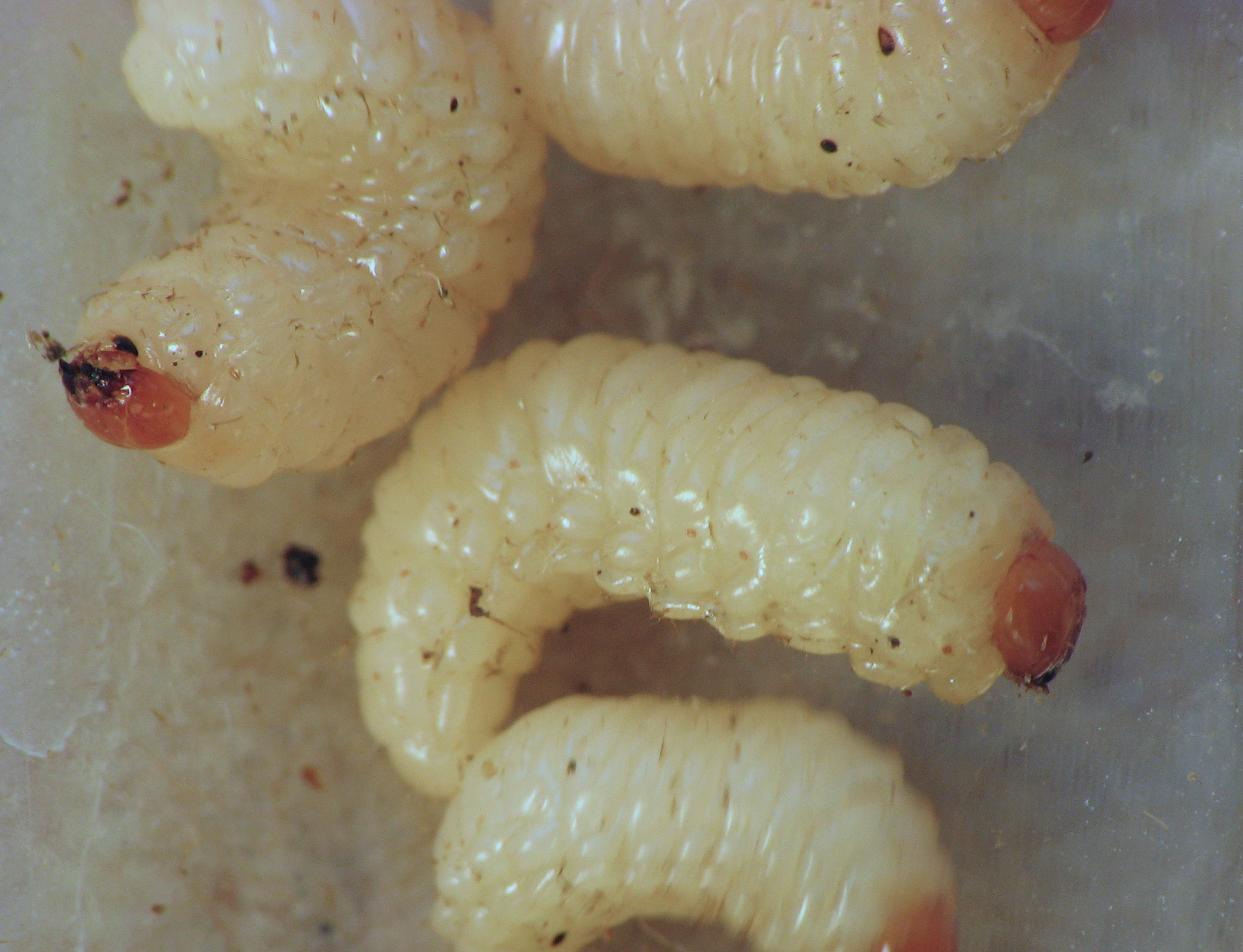
Curculio, scarabeiform larva

The subfamilies considered valid by at least some authors today:

- Bagoinae (sometimes in Molytinae)
- Baridinae
- Brachycerinae (disputed; sometimes placed at family level)
- Ceutorhynchinae (sometimes in Baridinae)
- Conoderinae (sometimes in Baridinae)
- Cossoninae
- Cryptorhynchinae (sometimes in Curculioninae)
  Cionus tuberculosus (Curculioninae)
  - Acalles
- Curculioninae – flower weevils, acorn and nut weevils

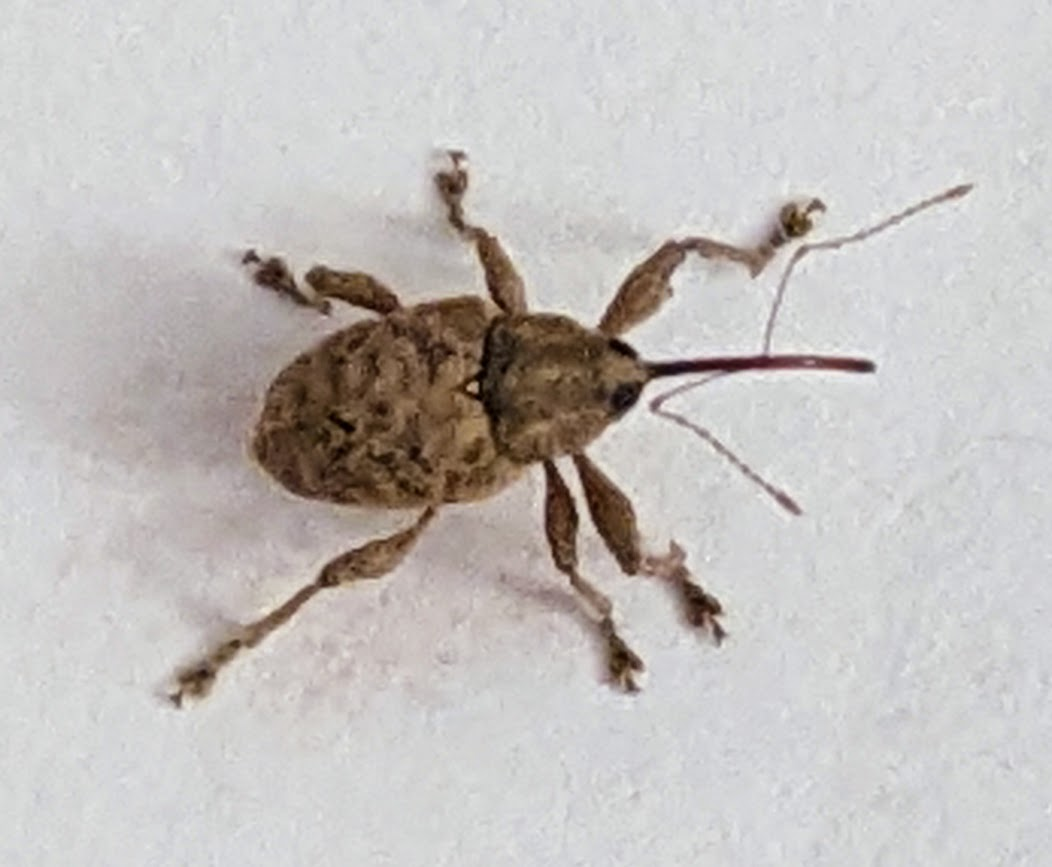
Curculio nucum, a brown nut-weevil

- Cyclominae
- Dryophthorinae (sometimes placed at family level)
- Entiminae – broad-nosed weevils
- Hyperinae (sometimes in Molytinae)
- Lixinae (sometimes in Molytinae)
- Mesoptiliinae (sometimes in Molytinae)
- Molytinae
- Orobitidinae - 2 genera:
  - Orobitis Germar, 1817
  - Parorobitis Korotyaev, Konstantinov & O'Brien, 2000
- Platypodinae – typical ambrosia beetles, "higher" Curculionidae
- Raymondionyminae (sometimes in Brachycerinae)
- Scolytinae – bark beetles
- Xiphaspidinae - monogeneric Xiphaspis G.A.K.Marshall, 1920 from Africa (sometimes in Baridinae)

== See also ==
- Black vine weevil
- Boll weevil
- Pecan weevil
- Wheat weevil
- Hylobius
- Orthorhinus cylindrirostris
- Premnotrypes
- Scolytoplatypus
- Pests and diseases of roses
