= List of Ceutorhynchus species =

This is a list of 406 species in the genus Ceutorhynchus.

== Ceutorhynchus species ==
- Ceutorhynchus abbreviatulus Germar, 1824
- Ceutorhynchus abbreviatus Gyll. in Schoenh., 1845
- Ceutorhynchus acephalus Say, 1831
- Ceutorhynchus adjunctus Deitz, 1896
- Ceutorhynchus adspersulus Dietz, 1896
- Ceutorhynchus adustus Korotyaev, 1980
- Ceutorhynchus aeneicollis Germar, 1824
- Ceutorhynchus aeratus Deitz, 1896
- Ceutorhynchus afer Colonnelli, 2006
- Ceutorhynchus affinis Stephens, 1829
- Ceutorhynchus alauda Germar, 1824
- Ceutorhynchus albiventris Sturm, 1826
- Ceutorhynchus albopilosulus Dietz, 1896
- Ceutorhynchus albovittatus Germar, 1824
- Ceutorhynchus alliaricola Colonnelli, 1987
- Ceutorhynchus alternosignata Marcu, 1959
- Ceutorhynchus americanus Buchanan, 1937
- Ceutorhynchus analis Germar, 1824
- Ceutorhynchus andreae Germar, 1824
- Ceutorhynchus angulatus LeConte, 1876
- Ceutorhynchus angulicollis Schultze, 1896
- Ceutorhynchus angustus Dieckmann, 1972
- Ceutorhynchus anomalus Korotyaev, 1980
- Ceutorhynchus anthonomoides Dietz, 1896
- Ceutorhynchus apenninus Colonnelli, 2011
- Ceutorhynchus arborator Korotyaev in Krivets & Korotyaev, 1998
- Ceutorhynchus arcanus Colonnelli, 2006
- Ceutorhynchus argenteomontanus Korotyaev, 1980
- Ceutorhynchus armatus Dietz, 1896
- Ceutorhynchus arquata Schoenherr, 1837
- Ceutorhynchus asiaticus Korotyaev, 1997
- Ceutorhynchus asperifoliarum Schoenherr, 1825
- Ceutorhynchus assimilis (Paykull, 1792)
- Ceutorhynchus ater Sturm, 1826
- Ceutorhynchus atlanticus Dieckmann, 1982
- Ceutorhynchus atriculus Dietz, 1896
- Ceutorhynchus attilae Korotyaev, 1997
- Ceutorhynchus audisiophilus Colonnelli, 2003
- Ceutorhynchus avtandili Korotyaev in Korotyaev & Cholokava, 1989
- Ceutorhynchus axillaris Germar, 1824
- Ceutorhynchus bakeri Hatch, 1971
- Ceutorhynchus barbareae Suffrian, 1847
- Ceutorhynchus barkalovi Korotyaev, 1977
- Ceutorhynchus batatae Waterhouse, 1849
- Ceutorhynchus behnei Korotyaev, 1997
- Ceutorhynchus bellus Korotyaev, 1981
- Ceutorhynchus belovi Korotyaev, 1995
- Ceutorhynchus bernhaueri Dieckmann, 1979
- Ceutorhynchus bifidus Colonnelli, 1987
- Ceutorhynchus binaghii Colonnelli, 1977
- Ceutorhynchus biskrensis Colonnelli, 1979
- Ceutorhynchus bohemani Colonnelli, 1986
- Ceutorhynchus bolteri Dietz, 1896
- Ceutorhynchus borisi Colonnelli, 2005
- Ceutorhynchus bruchoides Germar, 1824
- Ceutorhynchus buettikeri Colonnelli, 1984
- Ceutorhynchus cacciniae Iablokov-Khnzorian, 1964
- Ceutorhynchus caietani Colonnelli, 1992
- Ceutorhynchus camelinae Boheman, 1845
- Ceutorhynchus carbonarius Cristofori & Jan, 1832
- Ceutorhynchus cardariae Korotyaev, 1992
- Ceutorhynchus carteri Brown, 1931
- Ceutorhynchus castaneus Sturm, 1826
- Ceutorhynchus castor Germar, 1824
- Ceutorhynchus centralis Colonnelli, 2006
- Ceutorhynchus cestrotus Germar, 1824
- Ceutorhynchus chalybaeus Germar, 1824
- Ceutorhynchus chrysanthemi Germar, 1824
- Ceutorhynchus cochleariae Schoenherr, 1837
- Ceutorhynchus coerulescens Gyllenhal, 1837
- Ceutorhynchus coeruleus Colonnelli, 2005
- Ceutorhynchus collaris Sturm, 1826
- Ceutorhynchus comari Germar, 1824
- Ceutorhynchus commutatus Korotyaev, 1980
- Ceutorhynchus congeneer Germar, 1824
- Ceutorhynchus consanguineus Dietz, 1896
- Ceutorhynchus consputus Germar, 1824
- Ceutorhynchus contractus Schoenherr, 1826
- Ceutorhynchus contractus ssp. pallipes (Lundy Cabbage Weevil) Crotch, 1866
- Ceutorhynchus contusicollis Colonnelli, 2005
- Ceutorhynchus convexipennis Fall, 1917
- Ceutorhynchus coracinus Sturm, 1826
- Ceutorhynchus corinthius Germar, 1824
- Ceutorhynchus crassipes Korotyaev, 1980
- Ceutorhynchus crassirostris Foerster, B., 1891
- Ceutorhynchus cretura Say, 1831
- Ceutorhynchus cupreus Hatch, 1971
- Ceutorhynchus curtus Say, 1831
- Ceutorhynchus cyaneotinctus Colonnelli, 2005
- Ceutorhynchus cyanipennis Germar, 1824
- Ceutorhynchus dauricus Korotyaev, 1997
- Ceutorhynchus davidyani Korotyaev in Korotyaev & Cholokava, 1989
- Ceutorhynchus debskii Colonnelli, 1994
- Ceutorhynchus declivis Colonnelli, 1988
- Ceutorhynchus degravatus Scudder, 1893
- Ceutorhynchus demetrii Korotyaev, 1995
- Ceutorhynchus denticulatus Germar, 1824
- Ceutorhynchus dentipes Cristofori & Jan, 1832
- Ceutorhynchus depressicollis Germar, 1824
- Ceutorhynchus didymus Germar, 1824
- Ceutorhynchus dieckmannianus Colonnelli, 1987
- Ceutorhynchus dietzi Leng, 1920
- Ceutorhynchus disturbatus Dietz, 1896
- Ceutorhynchus doganlari Gültekin, 2005
- Ceutorhynchus downiei Colonnelli, 1979
- Ceutorhynchus dubitans Brown, 1931
- Ceutorhynchus duplicatus Korotyaev, 1980
- Ceutorhynchus echii Germar, 1824
- Ceutorhynchus echinatus Fall, 1917
- Ceutorhynchus egorovi Korotyaev, 1980
- Ceutorhynchus elegans Korotyaev, 1980
- Ceutorhynchus elidis Colonnelli, 2005
- Ceutorhynchus ensifer Sturm, 1826
- Ceutorhynchus eocenicus Cockerell, T.D.A., 1920
- Ceutorhynchus epilobii Germar, 1836
- Ceutorhynchus ericae Germar, 1824
- Ceutorhynchus erwini
- Ceutorhynchus erysimi (Fabricius, 1787)
- Ceutorhynchus erysinei (Fabricius, 1787)
- Ceutorhynchus erythropus Dietz, 1896
- Ceutorhynchus excelsus Colonnelli, 1997
- Ceutorhynchus faeculentus Gyllenhal, 1837
- Ceutorhynchus ferrugatus Perris, 1850
- Ceutorhynchus filirostris Colonnelli, 1979
- Ceutorhynchus filitarsis Korotyaev, 1980
- Ceutorhynchus fischeri Foerster, B., 1891
- Ceutorhynchus flavomarginatus Lucas, H., 1846
- Ceutorhynchus floralis Germar, 1824
- Ceutorhynchus floridanus Leng, 1916
- Ceutorhynchus foveicaudis Colonnelli, 2005
- Ceutorhynchus francisci Colonnelli, 1997
- Ceutorhynchus franzi Dieckmann, 1971
- Ceutorhynchus fritillariae Colonnelli, 1987
- Ceutorhynchus fuliginosus Stephens, 1829
- Ceutorhynchus fulvotertius Fall, 1926
- Ceutorhynchus funeratus Heyden, C. von & Heyden, L. von., 1866
- Ceutorhynchus gemuricus Korotyaev, 1997
- Ceutorhynchus geranii Germar, 1824
- Ceutorhynchus gibbipennis Germar, 1824
- Ceutorhynchus glabratus Sturm, 1826
- Ceutorhynchus globulus Germar, 1824
- Ceutorhynchus gnom Iablokov-Khnzorian, 1978
- Ceutorhynchus gottwaldi Dieckmann, 1972
- Ceutorhynchus gracilis Dieckmann, 1972
- Ceutorhynchus gramineus Germar, 1824
- Ceutorhynchus gratiosus Smreczynski, 1972
- Ceutorhynchus grisescens Colonnelli, 1979
- Ceutorhynchus gussakovskii Korotyaev, 1980
- Ceutorhynchus guttalis Germar, 1824
- Ceutorhynchus guttula Germar, 1824
- Ceutorhynchus gypsophilus Colonnelli in Velázquez de Castro, Blasco-Zumeta, Colonnelli, Pelletier, Alonso-Zarazaga & Sánchez-R
- Ceutorhynchus haemorrhoidalis Stephens, 1829
- Ceutorhynchus handfordi Brown, 1931
- Ceutorhynchus hearnei Brown, 1940
- Ceutorhynchus helenae Korotyaev, 1980
- Ceutorhynchus hirticornis Korotyaev, 1987
- Ceutorhynchus hirtissimus Korotyaev, 1980
- Ceutorhynchus hirtulus Germar, 1824
- Ceutorhynchus hornii Dietz, 1896
- Ceutorhynchus horridus Germar, 1824
- Ceutorhynchus hutchinsiae Tempère, 1975
- Ceutorhynchus ignitus Germar, 1824
- Ceutorhynchus imitator Korotyaev, 1980
- Ceutorhynchus inaequalis Say, 1831
- Ceutorhynchus inconspectus Germar, 1824
- Ceutorhynchus inermis Stephens, 1829
- Ceutorhynchus inops Colonnelli, 2006
- Ceutorhynchus insecabilis Colonnelli, 1998
- Ceutorhynchus insularis Dieckmann, 1971
- Ceutorhynchus intersectus Germar, 1824
- Ceutorhynchus invisus Fall, 1917
- Ceutorhynchus isabellinus Colonnelli, 1977
- Ceutorhynchus isatidis Colonnelli, 2003
- Ceutorhynchus isolatus Dietz, 1896
- Ceutorhynchus jacobsoni Korotyaev, 1980
- Ceutorhynchus janus Korotyaev, 1981
- Ceutorhynchus japonicus Korotyaev in Korotyaev & Hong, 2004
- Ceutorhynchus josefi Dieckmann, 1979
- Ceutorhynchus jucundus Colonnelli, 2005
- Ceutorhynchus jurganovae Korotyaev, 1980
- Ceutorhynchus kashmirensis Korotyaev, 1980
- Ceutorhynchus kaszabi Korotyaev, 1980
- Ceutorhynchus khnzoriani Korotyaev, 1980
- Ceutorhynchus kipchak Korotyaev, 1996
- Ceutorhynchus klementzorum Korotyaev, 1980
- Ceutorhynchus kolymensis Korotyaev, 1980
- Ceutorhynchus korotyaevi Colonnelli, 1981
- Ceutorhynchus krocha Korotyaev, 1980
- Ceutorhynchus lacteonotatus Colonnelli, 2005
- Ceutorhynchus laevigatus Sturm, 1826
- Ceutorhynchus lamii Germar, 1824
- Ceutorhynchus lecontei Colonnelli, 1979
- Ceutorhynchus lesquerellae Pierce, 1910
- Ceutorhynchus leucogaster Germar, 1824
- Ceutorhynchus levantinus Schultze, 1898
- Ceutorhynchus libertorum Colonnelli, 2005
- Ceutorhynchus libycus Colonnelli, 1977
- Ceutorhynchus liliicola Korotyaev, 1980
- Ceutorhynchus linicola Korotyaev, 1980
- Ceutorhynchus liratus Germar, 1824
- Ceutorhynchus litura (Fabricius, 1775)
- Ceutorhynchus loici Korotyaev & Gültekin, 2001
- Ceutorhynchus lothari Kryzhanovskaya, 1993
- Ceutorhynchus lucens Germar, 1824
- Ceutorhynchus lutzi Colonnelli, 2003
- Ceutorhynchus maculaalba Germar, 1824
- Ceutorhynchus madinae Korotyaev in Korotyaev, Ismailova, Arzanov, Davidyan & Prasolov, 1993
- Ceutorhynchus magnanoi Colonnelli, 2011
- Ceutorhynchus magnisinus Colonnelli, 1997
- Ceutorhynchus margaritae Korotyaev, 1980
- Ceutorhynchus marginatus Germar, 1824
- Ceutorhynchus mariannae Korotyaev, 2002
- Ceutorhynchus marmoratus Korotyaev, 1980
- Ceutorhynchus matisi Korotyaev, 1995
- Ceutorhynchus matthiolae Colonnelli, 1986
- Ceutorhynchus medialis LeConte, 1876
- Ceutorhynchus medvedevi Korotyaev, 1980
- Ceutorhynchus melanocephalus Stephens, 1829
- Ceutorhynchus melanorhynchus Stephens, 1829
- Ceutorhynchus melanostictus Germar, 1824
- Ceutorhynchus merkli Korotyaev, 2000
- Ceutorhynchus mesasiaticus Bajtenov, 1975
- Ceutorhynchus microtuberculatus Hatch, 1971
- Ceutorhynchus mirabilis Villa & Villa, 1844
- Ceutorhynchus moelleri C.G. Thoms., 1868
- Ceutorhynchus montanus Colonnelli, 1997
- Ceutorhynchus morosus Dietz, 1896
- Ceutorhynchus moznettei Fall, 1917
- Ceutorhynchus mucronulatus Germar, 1824
- Ceutorhynchus multinotatus Cristofori & Jan, 1832
- Ceutorhynchus munki Brown, 1940
- Ceutorhynchus murzini Korotyaev, 1994
- Ceutorhynchus mutabilis Dietz, 1896
- Ceutorhynchus myriophylli Germar, 1824
- Ceutorhynchus nairicus Korotyaev, 1992
- Ceutorhynchus nanoides Colonnelli, 1987
- Ceutorhynchus napi Germar, 1824
- Ceutorhynchus nasreddinovi Korotyaev, 1980
- Ceutorhynchus nasturtii Germar, 1824
- Ceutorhynchus neglectus Blatchley, 1916
- Ceutorhynchus nevadensis Hoffmann, A., 1960
- Ceutorhynchus nigrostriatus Colonnelli, 1998
- Ceutorhynchus nikitskii Korotyaev, 1997
- Ceutorhynchus nivalis Iablokov-Khnzorian, 1964
- Ceutorhynchus nodipennis Dietz, 1896
- Ceutorhynchus notatulus Fall, 1907
- Ceutorhynchus notula Germar, 1824
- Ceutorhynchus numulus Dietz, 1896
- Ceutorhynchus obliquus LeConte, 1876
- Ceutorhynchus obsoletus Germar, 1824
- Ceutorhynchus obstrictus (Marsham, 1802) (cabbage seedpod weevil)
- Ceutorhynchus oculatus Colonnelli, 1987
- Ceutorhynchus oleraceae Marshall, 1935
- Ceutorhynchus olgae Korotyaev, 1987
- Ceutorhynchus omissus Fall, 1917
- Ceutorhynchus opacus Korotyaev, 1980
- Ceutorhynchus opertus Brown, 1931
- Ceutorhynchus oregonensis Dietz, 1896
- Ceutorhynchus osellai Colonnelli, 1984
- Ceutorhynchus ovipennis Dietz, 1896
- Ceutorhynchus pallidactylus (Marsham, 1802) (cabbage stem weevil)
- Ceutorhynchus palustris Colonnelli, 1984
- Ceutorhynchus pantellarianus Colonnelli, 1979
- Ceutorhynchus pauxillus Dietz, 1896
- Ceutorhynchus pericarpius Germar, 1824
- Ceutorhynchus perpusillus Colonnelli, 2005
- Ceutorhynchus persimilis Dietz, 1896
- Ceutorhynchus pervestitus Fall, 1901
- Ceutorhynchus pfefferi Dieckmann, 1975
- Ceutorhynchus philippovi Korotyaev, 1980
- Ceutorhynchus pilosellus Gyllenhal, 1837
- Ceutorhynchus pinguis Colonnelli, 1987
- Ceutorhynchus pleurostigma Stephens, 1829
- Ceutorhynchus podlussanyi Colonnelli, 2003
- Ceutorhynchus poecilus Iablokov-Khnzorian, 1964
- Ceutorhynchus politus Germar, 1824
- Ceutorhynchus pollinarius Germar, 1824
- Ceutorhynchus pollinosus Dietz, 1896
- Ceutorhynchus posthumus Germar, 1824
- Ceutorhynchus potanini Korotyaev, 1980
- Ceutorhynchus pravus Colonnelli, 2005
- Ceutorhynchus priesneri Colonnelli, 2004
- Ceutorhynchus primevus Colonnelli, 1998
- Ceutorhynchus problematicus Korotyaev, 1980
- Ceutorhynchus pseudinclemens Dieckmann, 1969
- Ceutorhynchus pseudoarator Korotyaev in Korotyaev & Cholokava, 1989
- Ceutorhynchus pseudosirocalus Korotyaev, 1980
- Ceutorhynchus puberulus LeConte, 1876
- Ceutorhynchus pulvinatus Gyllenhal in Faldermann, 1837
- Ceutorhynchus punctiger (Gyllenhal, 1837)
- Ceutorhynchus punctulum Germar, 1824
- Ceutorhynchus pusillus LeConte, 1876
- Ceutorhynchus pusio Mannerheim, 1852
- Ceutorhynchus quadricornis Germar, 1824
- Ceutorhynchus quadridens (Panzer, 1795)
- Ceutorhynchus quadrimaculatus Germar, 1824
- Ceutorhynchus quadrituberculatus Germar, 1824
- Ceutorhynchus querceti (Gyllenhal, 1813)
- Ceutorhynchus quercus Germar, 1824
- Ceutorhynchus radula Germar, 1824
- Ceutorhynchus rapae (Gyllenhal, 1837) (cabbage curculio)
- Ceutorhynchus raphani Germar, 1824
- Ceutorhynchus remotus Colonnelli, 2006
- Ceutorhynchus rhodopensis Dieckmann, 1969
- Ceutorhynchus rimulosus Germar, 1824
- Ceutorhynchus robustus Korotyaev, 1980
- Ceutorhynchus romani Colonnelli, 2005
- Ceutorhynchus romashovi Korotyaev in Korotyaev & Cholokava, 1989
- Ceutorhynchus ruber Stephens, 1829
- Ceutorhynchus rubetra Sturm, 1826
- Ceutorhynchus rubicundus Germar, 1824
- Ceutorhynchus rubidus (Gyllenhal, 1837)
- Ceutorhynchus rubricollis Sturm, 1826
- Ceutorhynchus rudis LeConte, 1876
- Ceutorhynchus ruficollis Sturm, 1826
- Ceutorhynchus ruficornis Stephens, 1831
- Ceutorhynchus rufirostris Stephens, 1831
- Ceutorhynchus rugulosus Germar, 1824
- Ceutorhynchus saccoi Colonnelli, 2005
- Ceutorhynchus sanguinicollis Germar, 1824
- Ceutorhynchus satanas Colonnelli, 2005
- Ceutorhynchus scabrirostris Hochhuth, 1847
- Ceutorhynchus schatzmayri Colonnelli, 1977
- Ceutorhynchus scortillum Germar, 1824
- Ceutorhynchus scorzonerae Korotyaev, 1980
- Ceutorhynchus scutellaris Brullé, 1832
- Ceutorhynchus scytha Korotyaev, 1980
- Ceutorhynchus sebastiani Colonnelli, 2006
- Ceutorhynchus sellatus Germar, 1824
- Ceutorhynchus semirufus LeConte, 1876
- Ceutorhynchus septentrionalis (Gyllenhal, 1837)
- Ceutorhynchus sergii Korotyaev in Korotyaev & Cholokava, 1989
- Ceutorhynchus sericans LeConte, 1876
- Ceutorhynchus sicarius Germar, 1824
- Ceutorhynchus siculus Dietz, 1896
- Ceutorhynchus signatus Sturm, 1826
- Ceutorhynchus sii Guerin-Meneville, 1833
- Ceutorhynchus simillimus Korotyaev, 1980
- Ceutorhynchus simulans Korotyaev, 1980
- Ceutorhynchus sinapicola Dieckmann, 1975
- Ceutorhynchus sisymbrii Germar, 1824
- Ceutorhynchus sleeperi Colonnelli, 1979
- Ceutorhynchus sodalis Colonnelli, 1987
- Ceutorhynchus solitarius Fall, 1907
- Ceutorhynchus sparsus Hatch, 1971
- Ceutorhynchus sperans Colonnelli, 2006
- Ceutorhynchus sphaerula Korotyaev, 2007
- Ceutorhynchus squamatus LeConte, 1876
- Ceutorhynchus squamosulus Sleeper, 1957
- Ceutorhynchus squamulosus Sleeper, 1957
- Ceutorhynchus strejceki Dieckmann, 1981
- Ceutorhynchus subasperatus Korotyaev, 1980
- Ceutorhynchus subfasciatus Schoenherr, 1825
- Ceutorhynchus subovatus Korotyaev, 1980
- Ceutorhynchus subpubescens LeConte, 1876
- Ceutorhynchus subrufus Germar, 1824
- Ceutorhynchus sulcatus Sturm, 1826
- Ceutorhynchus sulcicollis (Paykull, 1800)
- Ceutorhynchus sunicus Iablokov-Khnzorian, 1964
- Ceutorhynchus suturatus Hatch, 1971
- Ceutorhynchus syrites Germar, 1824
- Ceutorhynchus tabularis Colonnelli, 2006
- Ceutorhynchus talickyi Korotyaev, 1980
- Ceutorhynchus tatricus Kratky, 2012
- Ceutorhynchus tau LeConte, 1876
- Ceutorhynchus tesquorum Korotyaev, 1980
- Ceutorhynchus tessellatus Schoenherr, 1826
- Ceutorhynchus theonae Korotyaev & Cholokava, 1989
- Ceutorhynchus thlaspivorus Colonnelli, 2005
- Ceutorhynchus tolli Korotyaev, 1980
- Ceutorhynchus transcaucasicus Korotyaev, 1980
- Ceutorhynchus transversus Blatchley, 1916
- Ceutorhynchus triangularis Say, 1831
- Ceutorhynchus trichoventris Bialooki & Szypula, 2006
- Ceutorhynchus trimaculatus Germar, 1824
- Ceutorhynchus tristis Korotyaev, 1981
- Ceutorhynchus troglodytes Germar, 1824
- Ceutorhynchus tropicalis Colonnelli, 2006
- Ceutorhynchus tshistyakovae Korotyaev, 1987
- Ceutorhynchus tuberculatus Sturm, 1826
- Ceutorhynchus turanensis Korotyaev, 1987
- Ceutorhynchus tyli Colonnelli, 1979
- Ceutorhynchus typhae (Herbst, 1795)
- Ceutorhynchus umbraculatus Schoenherr, 1825
- Ceutorhynchus uncipes Korotyaev, 1980
- Ceutorhynchus uncirostris Germar, 1824
- Ceutorhynchus urticae Boheman, 1845
- Ceutorhynchus ussuricus Korotyaev, 1997
- Ceutorhynchus variabilis Korotyaev, 1980
- Ceutorhynchus verae Korotyaev, 1980
- Ceutorhynchus vermiculosus Korotyaev, 1981
- Ceutorhynchus verticalis Colonnelli, 1992
- Ceutorhynchus vescerae Colonnelli, 1977
- Ceutorhynchus viduatus Germar, 1824
- Ceutorhynchus villiersi Tempère, 1984
- Ceutorhynchus vinokurovi Korotyaev, 2011
- Ceutorhynchus vorisekianus Colonnelli, 1981
- Ceutorhynchus wasabi Yoshitake in Yoshitake, Fujisawa, Goto & Chiba, 2011
- Ceutorhynchus wellschmiedi Dieckmann, 1979
- Ceutorhynchus williami Colonnelli, 1979
- Ceutorhynchus xanthopus Colonnelli, 1977
- Ceutorhynchus zarudnyi Korotyaev, 1980
- Ceutorhynchus zimmermanni (Gyllenhal, 1837)
- Ceutorhynchus zimmermannii
- Ceutorhynchus zinovjevi Korotyaev, 1980
- Ceutorhynchus znoikoi Korotyaev, 1980
- Ceutorhynchus zonatus Colonnelli, 1997
