= Garlic mustard as an invasive species =

Aspect of North American ecology

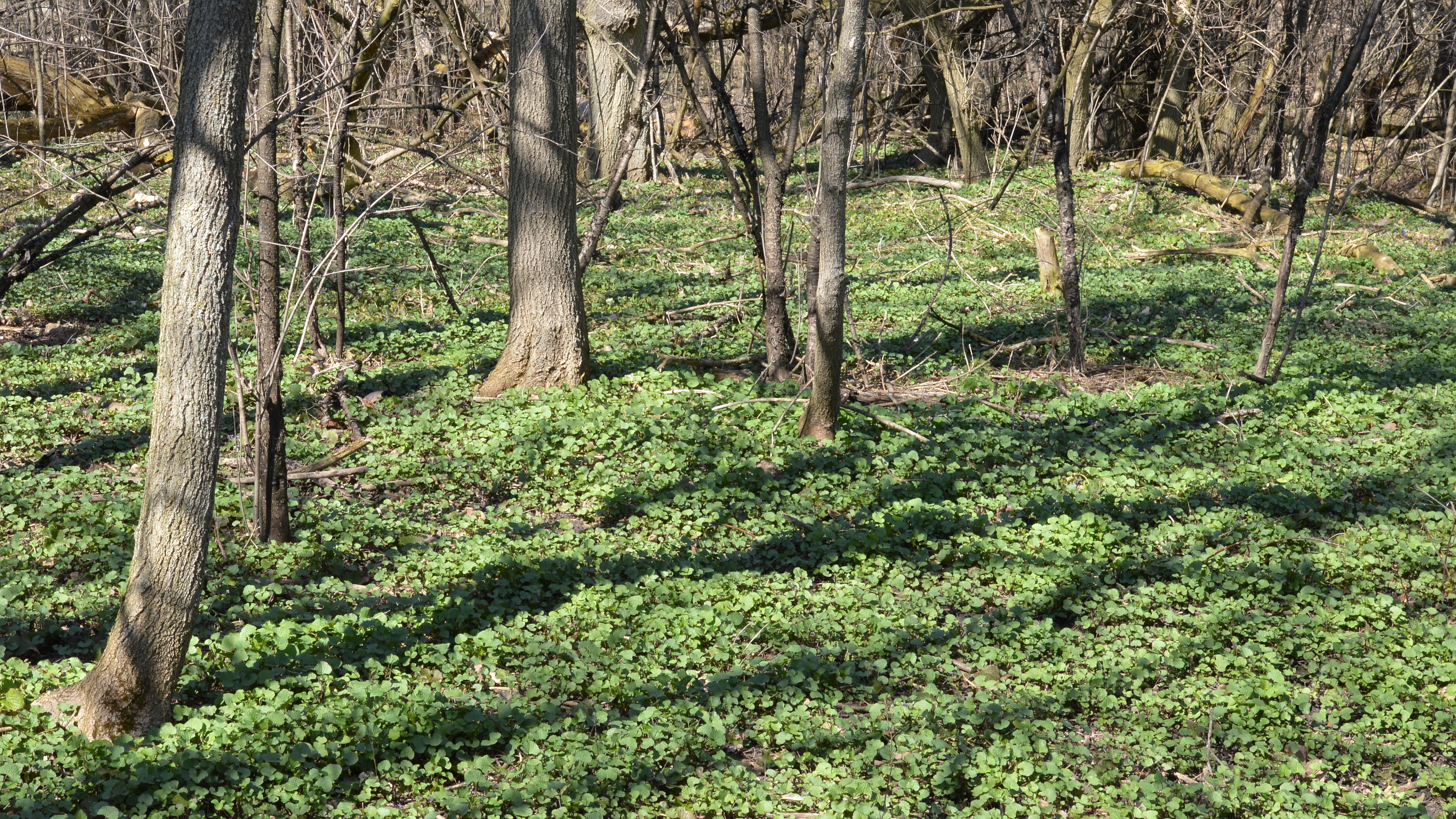
Colony of garlic mustard in Guelph, Ontario

Garlic mustard (Alliaria petiolata) was introduced to North America as a culinary herb in the 1860s and it is considered an invasive species in much of North America. As of 2020 it has been documented in most of the Eastern United States and Canada, with scattered populations in the west. It is listed as a noxious or restricted plant in the following states: Alabama, Connecticut, Massachusetts, Minnesota, New Hampshire, Oregon, Vermont, and Washington. A current map of its distribution in the United States can be found at the Early Detection and Distribution Mapping System (EDDmapS).

The most promising biological control agent, the monophagous weevil Ceutorhynchus scrobicollis, specifically studied since 2002, has been blocked for introduction into the US repeatedly by the USDA Technical Advisory, TAG, group before being approved in 2017, though regulatory hurdles remain. In Canada, C. scrobicollis was approved for release in 2018 and subsequently established in several sites across Ontario.

== Invasion biology ==
Like most invasive plants, once garlic mustard is introduced into a new location, it persists and spreads into undisturbed plant communities. In many areas of its introduction in Eastern North America, it has become the dominant under-story species in woodland and flood plain environments, where eradication is difficult.

=== Chemical release ===
Garlic mustard produces allelochemicals, mainly in the form of the compounds allyl isothiocyanate and benzyl isothiocyanate, which suppress mycorrhizal fungi that support the growth of native woodland plant species. This suppression of native plant growth poses a threat to native forests in its invaded range. In contrast, the allelochemicals produced by garlic mustard do not affect mycorrhizal fungi from garlic mustard's native range, indicating that these compounds contribute greatly to garlic mustard's success in North America through reducing competition.

Garlic mustard also produces a variety of secondary compounds including flavonoids, defense proteins, glycosides, and glucosinolates that reduce its palatability to herbivores. In northeastern forests, garlic mustard rosettes increase the rate of native leaf litter decomposition, increasing nutrient availability and possibly creating conditions favorable to garlic mustard's own spread.

=== Herbivory ===
In its invaded range, garlic mustard has undergone natural enemy release, wherein the insects and fungi which feed on the plant in its native habitat are not present in North America. The absence of these natural enemies increases the plant's seed productivity, helping it to out-compete native plants. One weevil, Mordellina ancilla has been observed feeding on garlic mustard but only once senescent, not affecting its reproductive output. Additionally, it is also toxic to some native insects, such as the caterpillars of North American butterflies in the genus Pieris such as Pieris virginiensis and Pieris oleracea, the former being an endangered species.

=== Interaction with deer ===
Generalist herbivores such as white-tailed deer have been observed avoiding grazing on garlic mustard. Because white-tailed deer rarely feed on garlic mustard, large deer populations may help to increase its population densities by consuming competing native plants.

The presence of deer has an interactive effect with garlic mustard presence in reducing populations of native plants. Trampling by browsing deer encourages additional seed growth by disturbing the soil. Seeds contained in the soil can germinate up to five years after being produced (and possibly more). The persistence of the seed bank and suppression of mycorrhizal fungi both complicate restoration of invaded areas because long-term removal is required to deplete the seed bank and allow recovery of mycorrhizae.

=== Interaction with human disturbance ===
In soils compacted by human foot traffic, roots may remain in the soil when manually pulled. As such, the efficiency of manual pulling to controlling garlic mustard is decreased in disturbed sites.

== Control strategies ==
=== Mechanical ===
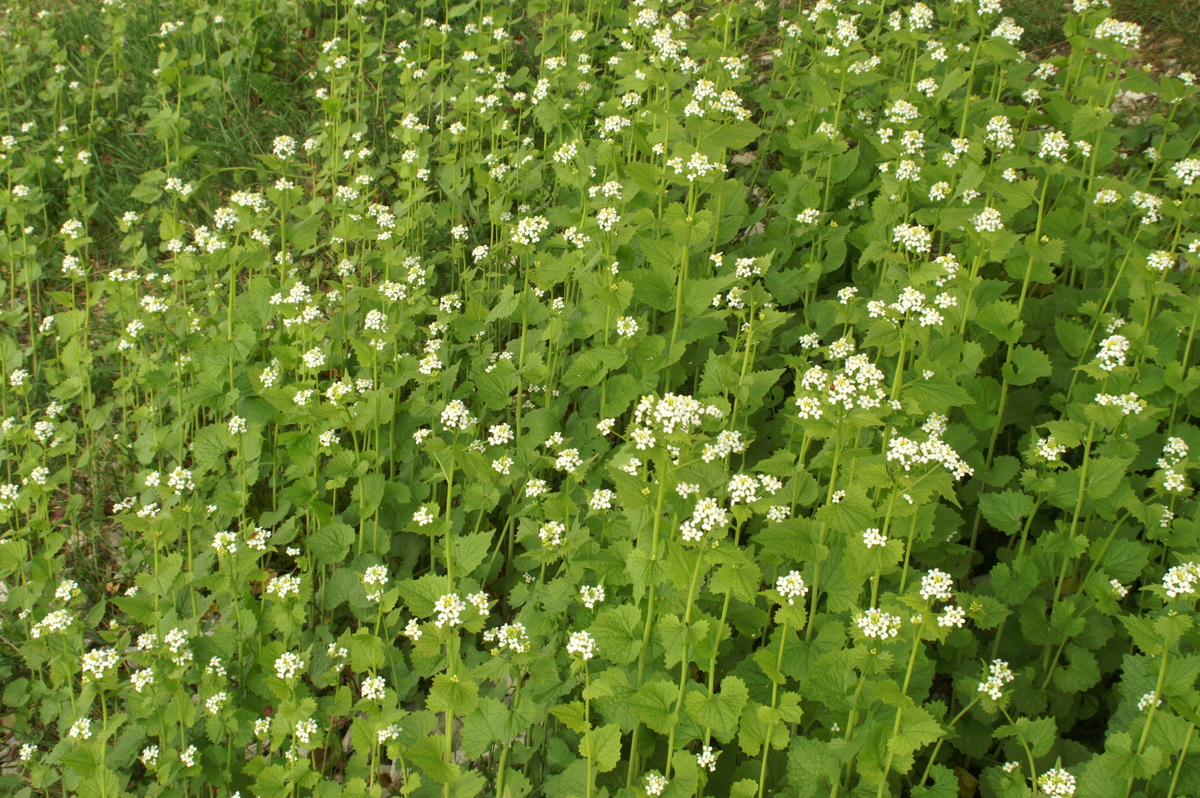
Second year, flowering plants

Preventing seed production and depletion of the soil seed bank are key to eradicating infestations, but seeds can last as long as twelve years and a single plant can produce thousands of seeds. Seeds are also easily spread by animals, vehicles, and people. Direct physical control methods include removal by hand-pulling or cutting at the base, mowing, burning, or manipulation of the environment to reduce light. These methods have varying levels of efficacy and vary in efficiency based on specific scenarios.

Pulling is more effective if the entire root is removed and desirable plants and soils are not trampled and compacted. Control is best in early spring prior to flowering when plants are smaller, allowing for less soil disturbance from pulling. This also gives more growing time for competing plants. However, pulling in early spring can leave some plants behind since they are smaller and easier to miss.

Mowing and cutting are also used to control garlic mustard. Although plants can keep growing, existing flowers can be eliminated and removes biomass supporting blooming and seeding. However, mowing can also encourage the spread of garlic mustard through trampling or by flinging its seeds and siliques.

Reduction of access to light does not prevent infestation since the plant can handle various levels of light exposure. However, smothering and other methods of reducing light penetration can slow down the growth of large garlic mustard patches.

Proper disposal of removed plant material is necessary in mechanical control. Pulled plants can bloom and produce seed, particularly if the roots remain attached, even while the plants are withering and dying.

=== Chemical ===
Chemical control may be achieved to some extent through foliar application of a number of herbicides. The efficacy of this chemical control is more efficient in highly disturbed situations like agricultural monocultures or urban and suburban gardens, rather than in complex settings, like forests and well-established meadows or prairies. Because garlic mustard typically begins activity earlier than native plants, application of herbicides in early spring helps to better target the species while sparing other plant species. However, some native and desirable plants have an even earlier phenology and should be considered when deciding to choose chemical control. These include flowering plants such as Ranunculaceae in the genera Pulsatilla and Helleborus. Some native and desirable plants also are evergreen and thus vulnerable to foliar and post-emergent herbicides year-round. Chemical solutions may also spread beyond its area of application through runoff, affecting non-target species.

=== Biological ===
Biological control of garlic mustard is an active area of research seeking to improve current control methods for the invasive species. Advantages of biological control over mechanical and chemical control include the avoidance of soil compaction and its self-sustaining control of garlic mustard. Biological control avoids the use of heavy equipment and human trampling of the soil which normally benefits garlic mustard. Biological control is also self-sustaining, allowing for continual depletion of the seed bank as each year's growth is controlled by control agents rather than having to repeatedly mow, pull, or spray patches. This is particularly an advantage for controlling garlic mustard which continues to actively colonize new patches.

Of the 69 natural enemy insects garlic mustard has in its native range, several have been tested for use as potential biological control agents. Five weevil species from the genus Ceutorhynchus and one flea beetle (Phyllotreta ochripes) were selected as candidates during preliminary testing. Of these species, the oligophagous weevil Ceutorhynchus scrobicollis was identified as the first possible agent for introduction in North America. The species attacks the roots of the plant, significantly reducing its survival rates. In host-specificity testing, C. scrobicollis only attacked one other native plant, Rorippa sinuata. However, in choice tests with garlic mustard, the weevil species consistently chose garlic mustard, reducing the likelihood of off-target effects of its introduction.

In 2008, the introduction of C. scrobicollis in North America for testing was recommended to the United States Department of Agriculture (USDA) but was blocked by the USDA's Technical Advisory Group for Biological Control of Weeds (TAG), citing a need for more research on introduction risks and efficiency. Additional requests were made in 2011, 2012, 2014, and 2016. In 2017, introduction was approved by TAG and the USDA's Animal and Plant Health Inspection Service (APHIS). The following year, its introduction was also approved by the Canadian Food Inspection Agency (CFIA). Several sites were selected in Ontario for release and initial monitoring indicates that the weevil appears to be successfully established. In 2023, a biological assessment was completed with the United States Fish and Wildlife Service.

Another weevil species, Ceutorhyncus constrictus, was also tested as a biological control agent of garlic mustard. This weevil attacks the seeds of the plant, thereby reducing reproductive output. In 2025, the CFIA approved the general release of C. constrictus for the control of garlic mustard.
