= Mordellina septemcarinata =

Scientific classification
- Kingdom: Animalia
- Phylum: Arthropoda
- Class: Insecta
- Order: Coleoptera
- Suborder: Polyphaga
- Infraorder: Cucujiformia
- Family: Mordellidae
- Subfamily: Mordellinae
- Tribe: Mordellini
- Genus: Mordellina
- Species: M. septemcarinata

Binomial name
- Mordellina septemcarinata (Champion, 1917)

Synonyms
- Mordellistena septemcarinata (Champion, 1917)

Species of beetle

Mordellina septemcarinata is a species of tumbling flower beetle in the family Mordellidae, found in the Seychelles.
