= Eve Veromann =

Estonian entomologist

- Born: 27 May 1961 (age 65)
- Education: University of Tartu; Estonian University of Life Sciences
- Known for: RNAi-based pest control; conservation biological control in oilseed rape
- Awards: Estonian National Science Award in Agricultural Sciences (2024); Silver Nature Conservation Badge (2025)
- Scientific career
- Fields: Entomology, agroecology, integrated pest management
- Workplaces: Estonian University of Life Sciences
- Thesis: Oilseed rape pests and their parasitoids in Estonia (2007)

Eve Veromann (born 27 May 1961) is an Estonian entomologist and academic. She is a full professor at the Estonian University of Life Sciences in the Chair of Plant Health, where her research focuses on integrated pest management, agroecology, conservation biological control, and the environmental risk assessment of RNA interference (RNAi)-based crop protection. She has been a member of the Genetically Modified Organisms Panel of the European Food Safety Authority since 2018, and in 2024 received the Estonian National Science Award in Agricultural Sciences. Alongside her research, she is active in science communication on sustainable and organic food production and the impacts of climate change on agriculture.

== Education ==
Veromann studied biology at the University of Tartu, graduating in 1986. She later completed her PhD in entomology at the Estonian University of Life Sciences in 2007 with a thesis titled Oilseed rape pests and their parasitoids in Estonia.

== Career and research ==
Veromann's academic career has been based at the Institute of Agricultural and Environmental Sciences of the Estonian University of Life Sciences, where she holds a professorship in applied entomology in the Chair of Plant Health. Her entomological research centres on the tritrophic interactions of cruciferous oilseed crops, in particular the biology and natural enemies of the pollen beetle (Brassicogethes aeneus, formerly Meligethes aeneus) and the cabbage seedpod weevil (Ceutorhynchus obstrictus), two major pests of European oilseed rape. A central strand of her work addresses landscape-scale conservation biological control, examining how semi-natural habitats, landscape complexity, and the spatiotemporal arrangement of crops shape pest pressure, pollinator abundance, and the activity of parasitoids and other natural enemies. Since the late 2010s, her group has worked on RNA interference (RNAi)-based control of oilseed rape pests. The group identified the coatomer subunit gene αCOP as an RNAi target in B. aeneus and reported that orally delivered double-stranded RNA (dsRNA) produced strong gene knockdown and high mortality under laboratory conditions. Subsequent studies have examined chronic dsRNA exposure, spray-induced gene silencing, the use of polymeric and clay-based nanocarriers to stabilise dsRNA in the insect gut, and risk assessments of non-target effects on pollinators and biocontrol insects. Veromann is the principal investigator of the Estonian Research Council project "Developing pest suppressive and pollination supportive agricultural landscapes" (PRG3201, 2026–2030) and leads the Estonian University of Life Sciences research group, focused on agricultural ecosystems, within the FutureScapes Centre of Excellence on Sustainable Land Use, a consortium led by the University of Tartu. She has served as principal investigator on 15 research projects and participated in more than 40, and has supervised five doctoral theses to completion, two of which received national awards.

== Service and editorial work ==
Veromann has been a member of the GMO Panel of the European Food Safety Authority since 2018, contributing to the environmental risk assessment of genetically modified crops in the European Union. She serves as an evaluator for Horizon Europe and the European Innovation Council, and as a peer reviewer for the research councils of Norway, Portugal and Germany. She chairs the Academic Ethics Committee of the Estonian University of Life Sciences, sits on the Scientific Committee of Tallinn Botanic Garden, and serves on the editorial boards of PLOS ONE, Scientific Reports, and several Frontiers journals.

== Public engagement ==
Veromann is a frequent contributor to public discussion of sustainable agriculture, organic food production, and the agricultural impacts of climate change in Estonia. Examples of her public engagement include a written piece in Postimees on the role of herbaceous field margins in mitigating climate-change impacts on agriculture, a public lecture on sustainable Estonian agriculture at a community event in Rõuge in September 2023, a 2024 interview on ERR's morning programme Terevisioon on organic agriculture and land use, an appearance on the Estonian science podcast Tervise Seisund, and a talk on organic and regenerative agriculture at a community festival in Obinitsa in May 2026. She has also been the subject of profile coverage in the Estonian press.

== Awards and honours ==
- 2025: Silver Nature Conservation Badge (Eesti looduskaitsemärk), Estonian Ministry of Climate.
- 2024: Estonian National Science Award in Agricultural Sciences, for the research cycle Innovative RNAi approach in pest control and implementation of ecosystem services in sustainable agriculture.
- 2024: Lecturer of the Year, Institute of Agricultural and Environmental Sciences, Estonian University of Life Sciences.
- 2024: Letter of Appreciation from the Estonian Minister of Education and Research, as supervisor of a doctoral thesis awarded first prize in the Estonian National Student Research Contest.
- 2018: Medal of Merit, Estonian University of Life Sciences.

== Selected publications ==
- Willow, J., Sulg, S., Taning, C.N.T., Silva, A.I., Christiaens, O., Kaasik, R., Prentice, K., Smagghe, G., & Veromann, E. (2021). "Targeting a coatomer protein complex-I gene via RNA interference results in effective lethality in the pollen beetle Brassicogethes aeneus." Journal of Pest Science, 94(3), 703–712. doi:10.1007/s10340-020-01288-6
- Willow, J., Soonvald, L., Sulg, S., Kaasik, R., Silva, A.I., Taning, C.N.T., Christiaens, O., Smagghe, G., & Veromann, E. (2021). "RNAi efficacy is enhanced by chronic dsRNA feeding in pollen beetle." Communications Biology, 4, 444. doi:10.1038/s42003-021-01975-9
- Willow, J., Taning, C.N.T., Cook, S.M., Sulg, S., Silva, A.I., Smagghe, G., & Veromann, E. (2021). "RNAi targets in agricultural pest insects: advancements, knowledge gaps, and IPM." Frontiers in Agronomy, 3, 794312. doi:10.3389/fagro.2021.794312
- Vilumets, S., Kaasik, R., Lof, M.E., Kovács, G., Bishop, J., & Veromann, E. (2023). "Landscape complexity effects on Brassicogethes aeneus abundance and larval parasitism rate: a two-year field study." Scientific Reports, 13, 22373. doi:10.1038/s41598-023-49690-1
- Sulg, S., Kovács, G., Willow, J., Kaasik, R., Smagghe, G., Lövei, G.L., & Veromann, E. (2024). "Spatiotemporal distancing of crops reduces pest pressure while maintaining conservation biocontrol in oilseed rape." Pest Management Science, 80(5), 2250–2259. doi:10.1002/ps.7391
- Willow, J., Kallavus, T., Dos Santos, É.A., Vilumets, S., Taning, C.N.T., Asseman, G., Smagghe, G., & Veromann, E. (2025). "First insights towards RNAi-based management of the pollen beetle Brassicogethes viridescens, with risk assessment against model non-target pollinator and biocontrol insects." Journal of Pest Science, 98, 1689–1697. doi:10.1007/s10340-025-01873-7
- Knauer, A., Adhikari, S., Andersson, G.K.S., ..., Tamburini, G., Uzman, D., Veromann, E., Vialatte, A., et al. (2026). "Pesticides and habitat loss additively reduce wild bees in crop fields." Nature Ecology & Evolution, 10, 95–104. doi:10.1038/s41559-025-02924-z
- Kallavus, T., Soonvald, L., Callewaert, I., Silva, A.I., Ávila Dos Santos, E., Vilumets, S., et al. (2026). "Synthetic polymer nanocarrier enhances dsRNA stability but not RNAi efficacy in Brassicogethes aeneus." Pest Management Science. doi:10.1002/ps.70516
