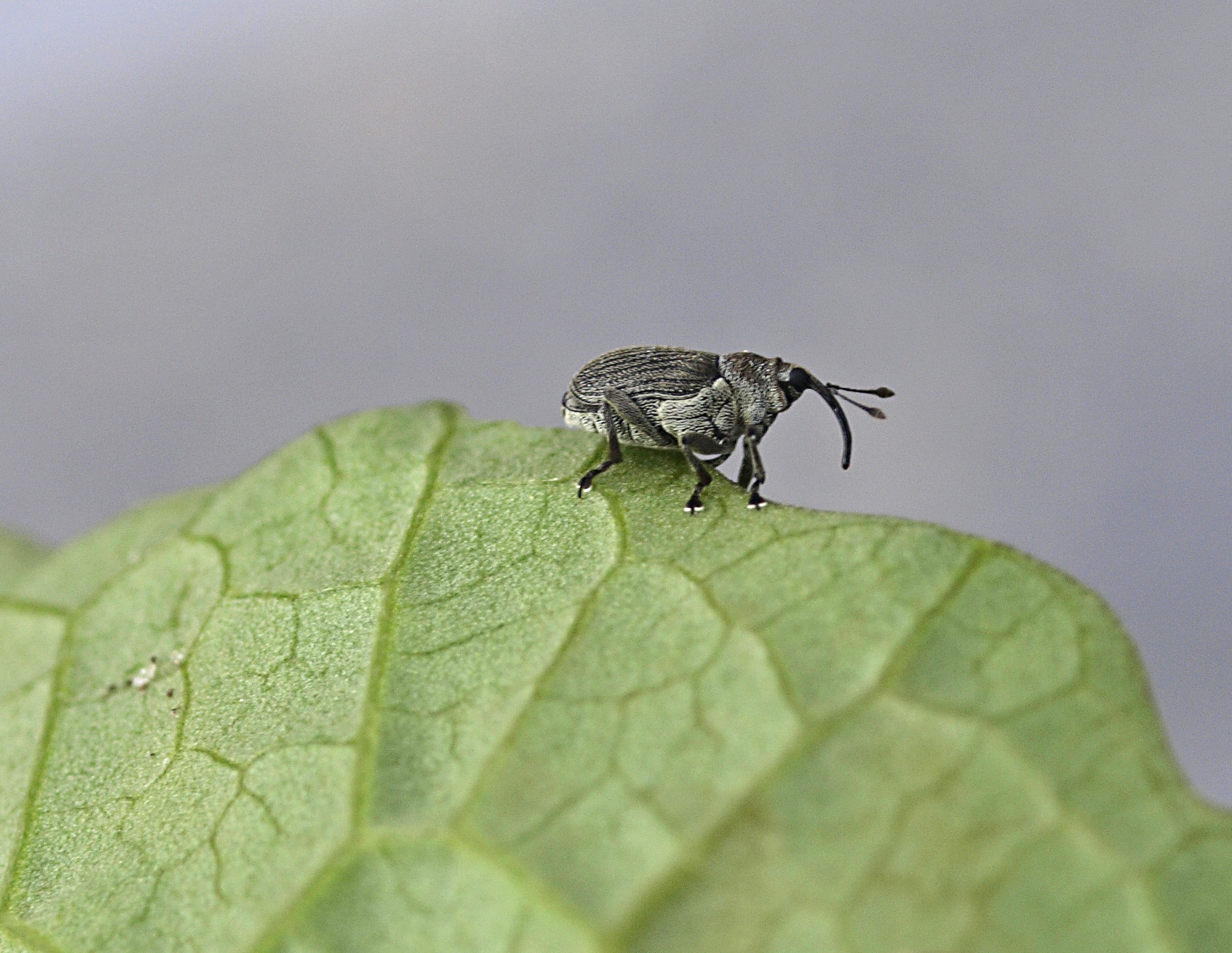

Scientific classification
- Domain: Eukaryota
- Kingdom: Animalia
- Phylum: Arthropoda
- Class: Insecta
- Order: Coleoptera
- Suborder: Polyphaga
- Infraorder: Cucujiformia
- Family: Curculionidae
- Genus: Ceutorhynchus
- Species: C. constrictus

Binomial name
- Ceutorhynchus constrictus Schoenherr, 1845

= Ceutorhynchus constrictus =

Species of seed-feeding weevil in the family Curculionidae

Ceutorhynchus constrictus is a species of minute seed weevil in the family Curculionidae. It is native to Europe, but has been released as a biological control agent for garlic mustard in North America.

== Description ==
This weevil varies from 1.8-2.3mm in size.

== Habitat ==
This weevil occurs in forests and meadows.

== Diet ==
This weevil is oligophagous on Brassicaceae.
