= Mordellina lecontei =

Scientific classification
- Kingdom: Animalia
- Phylum: Arthropoda
- Class: Insecta
- Order: Coleoptera
- Suborder: Polyphaga
- Infraorder: Cucujiformia
- Family: Mordellidae
- Subfamily: Mordellinae
- Tribe: Mordellini
- Genus: Mordellina
- Species: M. lecontei

Binomial name
- Mordellina lecontei (Ermisch, 1953)

Synonyms
- Mordellistena lecontei Ermisch, 1953; Mordellistena ruficeps LeConte, 1862

Species of beetles

Mordellina lecontei is a species of tumbling flower beetle in the family Mordellidae.
