= Mordellina atrofusca =

Scientific classification
- Kingdom: Animalia
- Phylum: Arthropoda
- Class: Insecta
- Order: Coleoptera
- Suborder: Polyphaga
- Infraorder: Cucujiformia
- Family: Mordellidae
- Genus: Mordellina
- Species: M. atrofusca

Binomial name
- Mordellina atrofusca (Nomura, 1951)

Species of beetle

Mordellina atrofusca is a species of beetle in the genus Mordellina. It was described in 1951.

The Latin specific epithet atrofusca means "dark brown".
