= Mordellina floridensis =

Scientific classification
- Kingdom: Animalia
- Phylum: Arthropoda
- Class: Insecta
- Order: Coleoptera
- Suborder: Polyphaga
- Infraorder: Cucujiformia
- Family: Mordellidae
- Genus: Mordellina
- Species: M. floridensis

Binomial name
- Mordellina floridensis (Smith, 1882)

Synonyms
- Mordellistena floridensis Smith, 1882

Species of beetles

Mordellina floridensis is a species of tumbling flower beetle in the family Mordellidae.
