= Ceutorhynchus disturbatus =

Scientific classification
- Domain: Eukaryota
- Kingdom: Animalia
- Phylum: Arthropoda
- Class: Insecta
- Order: Coleoptera
- Suborder: Polyphaga
- Infraorder: Cucujiformia
- Family: Curculionidae
- Genus: Ceutorhynchus
- Species: C. disturbatus

Binomial name
- Ceutorhynchus disturbatus Dietz, 1896

Species of beetle

Ceutorhynchus disturbatus is a species of minute seed weevil in the beetle family Curculionidae. It is found in North America.
