= Mordellina wickhami =

Scientific classification
- Domain: Eukaryota
- Kingdom: Animalia
- Phylum: Arthropoda
- Class: Insecta
- Order: Coleoptera
- Suborder: Polyphaga
- Infraorder: Cucujiformia
- Family: Mordellidae
- Tribe: Mordellini
- Genus: Mordellina
- Species: M. wickhami

Binomial name
- Mordellina wickhami (Liljeblad, 1945)

Synonyms
- Mordellistena wickhami Liljeblad, 1945

Species of beetle

Mordellina wickhami is a species of tumbling flower beetle in the family Mordellidae. It is found in North America.
