= Mordellina semiusta =

Scientific classification
- Kingdom: Animalia
- Phylum: Arthropoda
- Class: Insecta
- Order: Coleoptera
- Suborder: Polyphaga
- Infraorder: Cucujiformia
- Family: Mordellidae
- Subfamily: Mordellinae
- Tribe: Mordellini
- Genus: Mordellina
- Species: M. semiusta

Binomial name
- Mordellina semiusta (LeConte, 1862)

Synonyms
- Mordellistena semiusta LeConte, 1862

Species of beetles

Mordellina semiusta is a species of tumbling flower beetle in the family Mordellidae. It is found in North America.
