= Ceutorhynchus carteri =

Scientific classification
- Kingdom: Animalia
- Phylum: Arthropoda
- Clade: Pancrustacea
- Class: Insecta
- Order: Coleoptera
- Suborder: Polyphaga
- Infraorder: Cucujiformia
- Superfamily: Curculionoidea
- Family: Curculionidae
- Genus: Ceutorhynchus
- Species: C. carteri

Binomial name
- Ceutorhynchus carteri W.J. Brown, 1931

Species of weevil

Ceutorhynchus carteri is a weevil of the genus Ceutorhynchus. It is endemic to the province of Alberta in Canada. It is 2.2 mm long and 1.1 mm wide with a black prothorax and venter and a piceous elytra covered in white scales, as is the venter and piceous antennas, which are segmented. The femur is black with white hairs, and the antennas are segmented and piceous in colour. The species was described from a single specimen from the city of Brooks, which was collected from alfalfa leaves in June 1923.
