= Mordellina minutalis =

Scientific classification
- Kingdom: Animalia
- Phylum: Arthropoda
- Class: Insecta
- Order: Coleoptera
- Suborder: Polyphaga
- Infraorder: Cucujiformia
- Family: Mordellidae
- Subfamily: Mordellinae
- Tribe: Mordellini
- Genus: Mordellina
- Species: M. minutalis

Binomial name
- Mordellina minutalis (Liljeblad, 1945)

Synonyms
- Mordellistena minutalis Liljeblad, 1945

Species of beetles

Mordellina minutalis is a species of tumbling flower beetle in the family Mordellidae.
