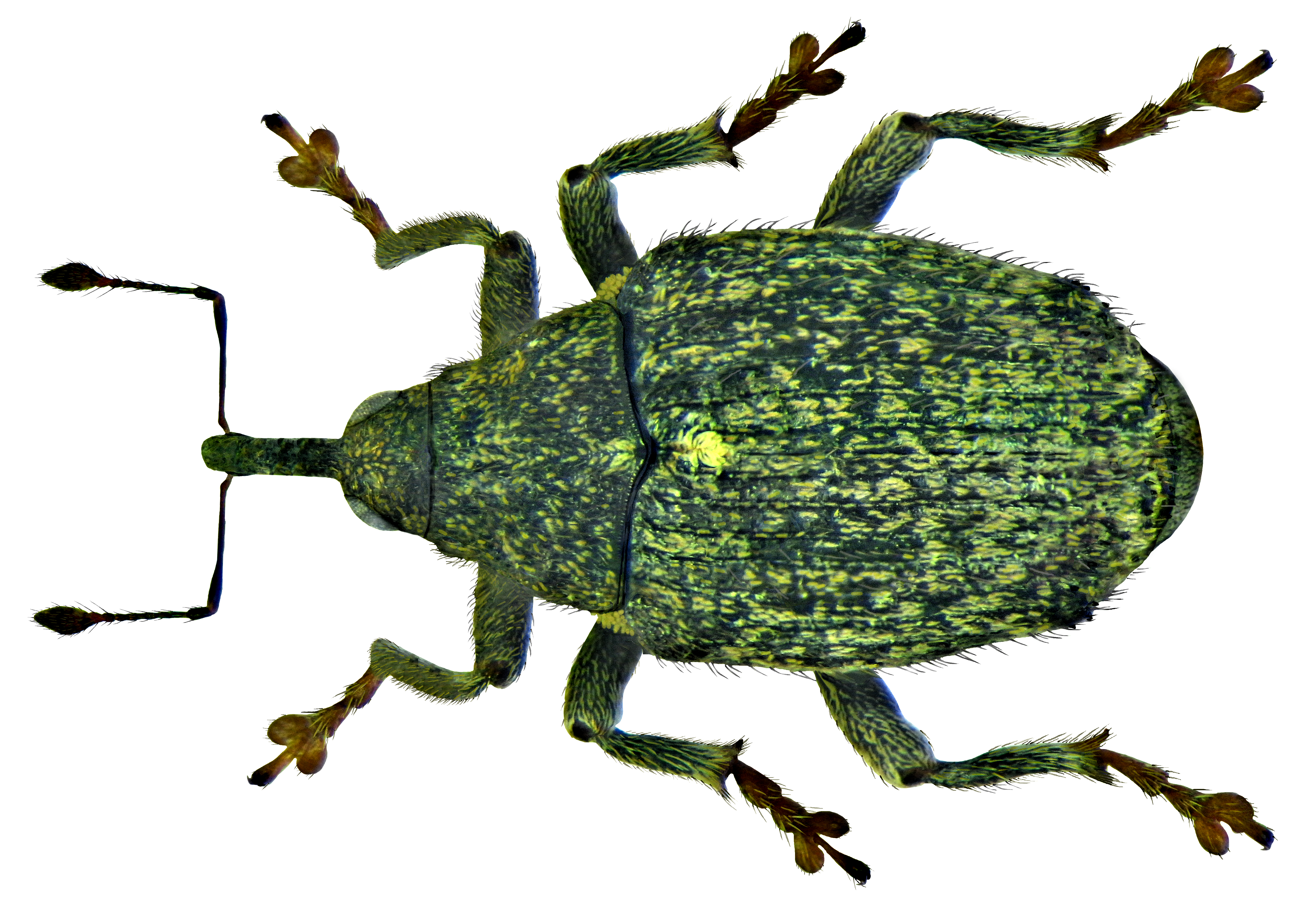
- Ceutorhynchus pallidactylus (2,3-3,5 mm)

Scientific classification
- Kingdom: Animalia
- Phylum: Arthropoda
- Class: Insecta
- Order: Coleoptera
- Suborder: Polyphaga
- Infraorder: Cucujiformia
- Family: Curculionidae
- Genus: Ceutorhynchus
- Species: C. pallidactylus

Binomial name
- Ceutorhynchus pallidactylus (Marsham, 1802)

= Ceutorhynchus pallidactylus =

Species of beetle native to Europe

Ceutorhynchus pallidactylus is a species of weevil native to Europe.
