= Ceutorhynchus semirufus =

Scientific classification
- Kingdom: Animalia
- Phylum: Arthropoda
- Class: Insecta
- Order: Coleoptera
- Suborder: Polyphaga
- Infraorder: Cucujiformia
- Family: Curculionidae
- Genus: Ceutorhynchus
- Species: C. semirufus

Binomial name
- Ceutorhynchus semirufus LeConte, 1876

Species of beetle

Ceutorhynchus semirufus is a species of minute seed weevil in the family Curculionidae. It is found in North America.
