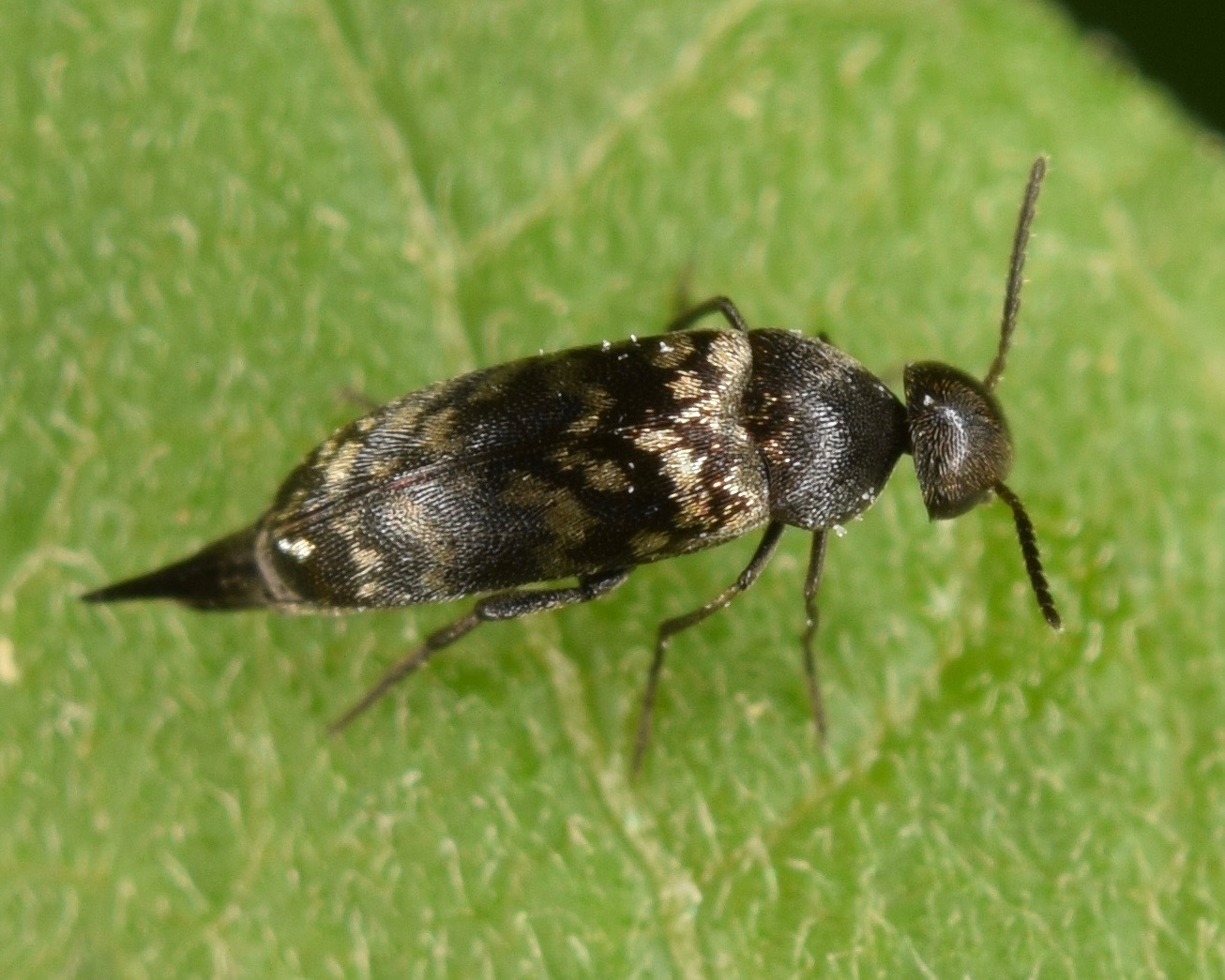
- Mordellina pustulata, Georgia

Scientific classification
- Domain: Eukaryota
- Kingdom: Animalia
- Phylum: Arthropoda
- Class: Insecta
- Order: Coleoptera
- Suborder: Polyphaga
- Infraorder: Cucujiformia
- Family: Mordellidae
- Tribe: Mordellini
- Genus: Mordellina
- Species: M. pustulata

Binomial name
- Mordellina pustulata (Melsheimer, 1845)

= Mordellina pustulata =

Species of beetle

Mordellina pustulata is a species of tumbling flower beetle in the family Mordellidae. It is found in North America.
