= Mordellina parva =

Scientific classification
- Kingdom: Animalia
- Phylum: Arthropoda
- Class: Insecta
- Order: Coleoptera
- Suborder: Polyphaga
- Infraorder: Cucujiformia
- Family: Mordellidae
- Subfamily: Mordellinae
- Tribe: Mordellini
- Genus: Mordellina
- Species: M. parva

Binomial name
- Mordellina parva (Gyllenhal, 1827)

Synonyms
- Mordellistena parva Liljeblad, 1945

Species of beetles

Mordellina parva is a species of tumbling flower beetle in the family Mordellidae.
