= Mordellina marginalis =

Scientific classification
- Domain: Eukaryota
- Kingdom: Animalia
- Phylum: Arthropoda
- Class: Insecta
- Order: Coleoptera
- Suborder: Polyphaga
- Infraorder: Cucujiformia
- Family: Mordellidae
- Subfamily: Mordellinae
- Tribe: Mordellini
- Genus: Mordellina
- Species: M. marginalis

Binomial name
- Mordellina marginalis Nomura, 1967

Species of beetle

Mordellina marginalis is a species of beetle in the genus Mordellina, found in temperate Asia. It was described in 1967.
