= Ceutorhynchus neglectus =

Scientific classification
- Domain: Eukaryota
- Kingdom: Animalia
- Phylum: Arthropoda
- Class: Insecta
- Order: Coleoptera
- Suborder: Polyphaga
- Infraorder: Cucujiformia
- Family: Curculionidae
- Genus: Ceutorhynchus
- Species: C. neglectus

Binomial name
- Ceutorhynchus neglectus Blatchley, 1916

Species of beetle

Ceutorhynchus neglectus is a species of minute seed weevil in the beetle family Curculionidae. It is found in North America.
