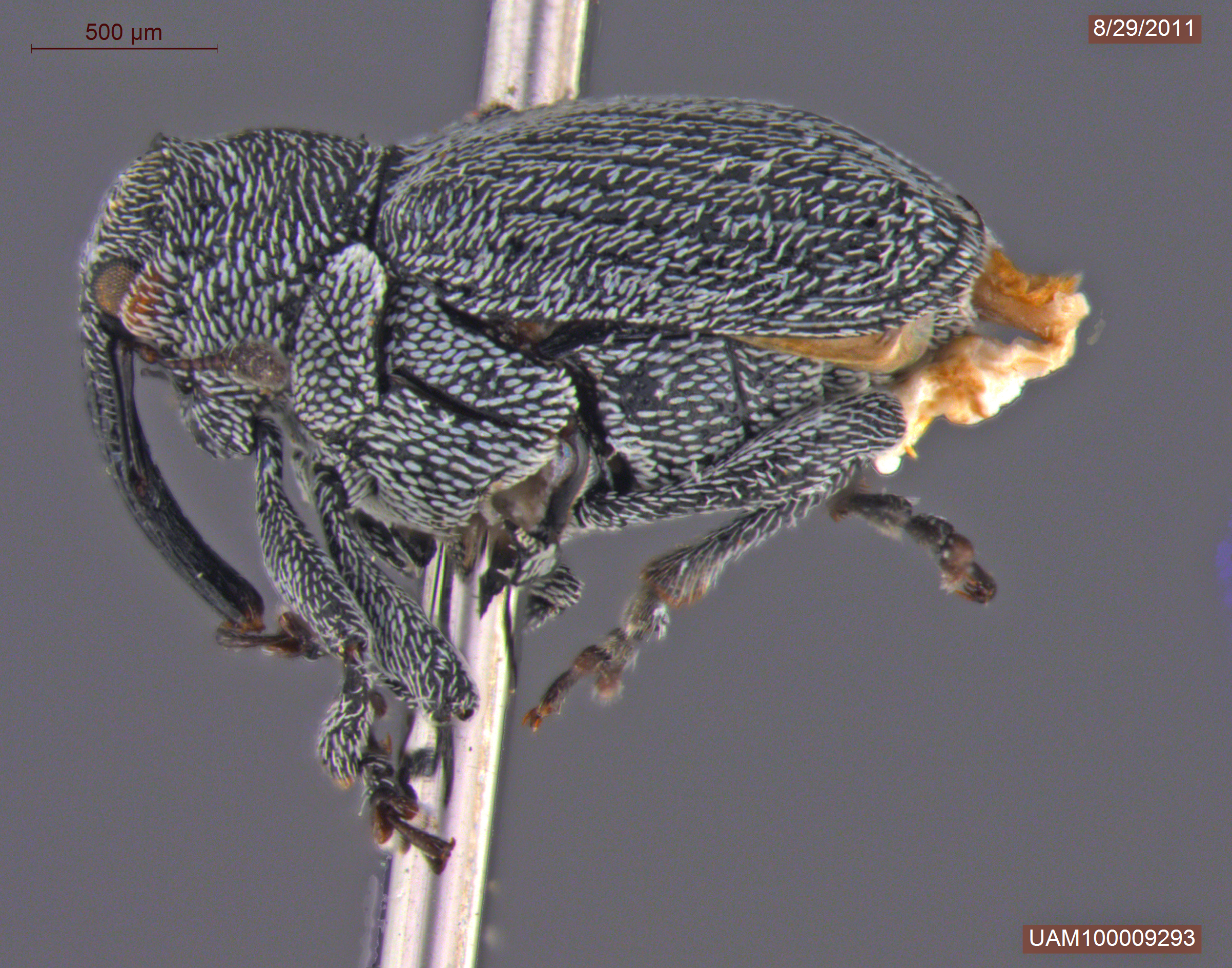
- Lateral view of pinned specimen

Scientific classification
- Kingdom: Animalia
- Phylum: Arthropoda
- Class: Insecta
- Order: Coleoptera
- Suborder: Polyphaga
- Infraorder: Cucujiformia
- Family: Curculionidae
- Genus: Ceutorhynchus
- Species: C. rapae

Binomial name
- Ceutorhynchus rapae (Gyllenhal, 1837)

Synonyms
- Ceutorhynchus affluentus Dietz, 1896

= Ceutorhynchus rapae =

Species of beetle

Ceutorhynchus rapae, or the cabbage curculio, is a species of minute seed weevil in the beetle family Curculionidae. It is found in North America and Europe. It feeds on Erysimum crepidifolium, Erysimum cheiranthoides, and Capsella bursa-pastoris.
