= Mordellina nigricans =

Scientific classification
- Kingdom: Animalia
- Phylum: Arthropoda
- Class: Insecta
- Order: Coleoptera
- Suborder: Polyphaga
- Infraorder: Cucujiformia
- Family: Mordellidae
- Subfamily: Mordellinae
- Tribe: Mordellini
- Genus: Mordellina
- Species: M. nigricans

Binomial name
- Mordellina nigricans (Melsheimer, 1846)

Synonyms
- Mordellistena nigricans Melsheimer, 1845

Species of beetles

Mordellina nigricans is a species of tumbling flower beetle in the family Mordellidae. It is found in North America.
