= Mordellina impatiens =

Scientific classification
- Domain: Eukaryota
- Kingdom: Animalia
- Phylum: Arthropoda
- Class: Insecta
- Order: Coleoptera
- Suborder: Polyphaga
- Infraorder: Cucujiformia
- Family: Mordellidae
- Genus: Mordellina
- Species: M. impatiens

Binomial name
- Mordellina impatiens (LeConte, 1862)

Synonyms
- Mordellistena impatiens LeConte, 1862

Species of beetle

Mordellina impatiens is a species of tumbling flower beetle in the family Mordellidae. It is found in North America.
