= Mordellina janae =

Scientific classification
- Domain: Eukaryota
- Kingdom: Animalia
- Phylum: Arthropoda
- Class: Insecta
- Order: Coleoptera
- Suborder: Polyphaga
- Infraorder: Cucujiformia
- Family: Mordellidae
- Subfamily: Mordellinae
- Tribe: Mordellini
- Genus: Mordellina
- Species: M. janae

Binomial name
- Mordellina janae Horák, Farkac & Nakládal, 2012

Species of beetle

Mordellina janae is a species of beetle in the genus Mordellina. It was described in 2012.
