= Mordellina gina =

Scientific classification
- Domain: Eukaryota
- Kingdom: Animalia
- Phylum: Arthropoda
- Class: Insecta
- Order: Coleoptera
- Suborder: Polyphaga
- Infraorder: Cucujiformia
- Family: Mordellidae
- Genus: Mordellina
- Species: M. gina

Binomial name
- Mordellina gina Nomura, 1967

Species of beetle

Mordellina gina is a species of tumbling flower beetle in the family Mordellidae, found in temperate Asia.
