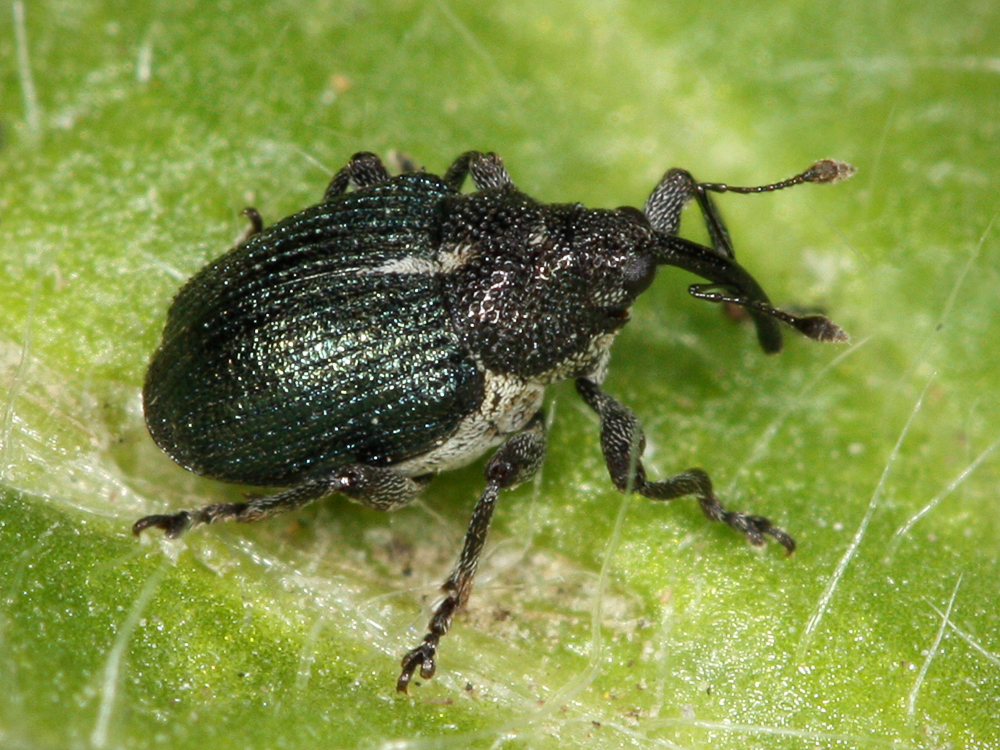

Scientific classification
- Domain: Eukaryota
- Kingdom: Animalia
- Phylum: Arthropoda
- Class: Insecta
- Order: Coleoptera
- Suborder: Polyphaga
- Infraorder: Cucujiformia
- Family: Curculionidae
- Genus: Ceutorhynchus
- Species: C. americanus

Binomial name
- Ceutorhynchus americanus Buchanan, 1937

= Ceutorhynchus americanus =

Species of beetle

Ceutorhynchus americanus is a species of true weevils in the tribe Ceutorhynchini. It is found in Alaska, United States, as well as Ontario, Canada. It feeds on the stems of Raphanus raphanistrum.

Feeding habits and host plants

Seeing as Raphanus species are not native in the same distribution as the listed C. americanus' native distribution one can assume this species' main host plant isn't Raphanus sp. but merely able to generally browse on Raphanus sp. It has also been observed by amateur observers on garlic mustard, fawn lily, and day lily. More studies are needed to learn the feeding habits of this species. Though species in this genus have been looked at as a biological control against Garlic mustard in the past.
