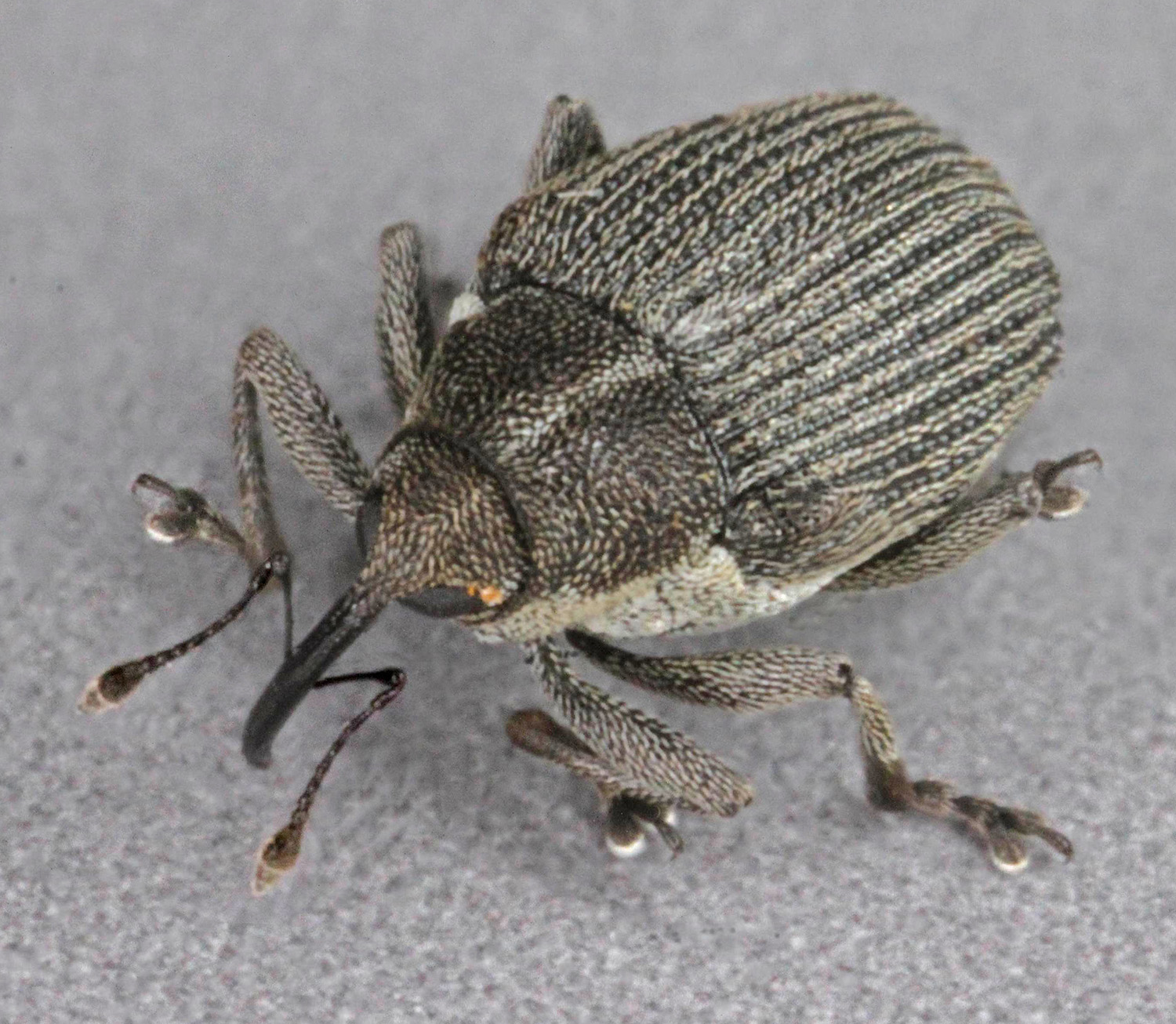
- Ceutorhynchus obstrictus, Deeside, North Wales

Scientific classification
- Kingdom: Animalia
- Phylum: Arthropoda
- Class: Insecta
- Order: Coleoptera
- Suborder: Polyphaga
- Infraorder: Cucujiformia
- Family: Curculionidae
- Genus: Ceutorhynchus
- Species: C. obstrictus

Binomial name
- Ceutorhynchus obstrictus (Marsham, 1802)

Synonyms
- Curculio obstrictus

= Ceutorhynchus obstrictus =

Species of beetle

Ceutorhynchus obstrictus, the cabbage seedpod weevil, is a species of snout beetles or true weevils which is widespread in Europe and lives on several types of crucifers. The adult weevils feed on the leaves, but breed in the seedpods, where the larvae destroy the seeds. It can be a harmful pest on crops like rapeseed/canola (Brassica napus), cabbage and relatives (Brassica oleracea) or Brassica rapa.

== Distribution ==
C. obstrictus is native to Europe and is also found in parts of Asia. Starting in the early 1930s it has been reported from North America (as Ceutorhynchus assimilis, a misidentification). It was first collected in Washington State and near Vancouver in western Canada. It is now more widely distributed in North America, especially in regions growing rapeseed (canola) where it is regarded as an important invasive pest.

== Taxonomy ==
There has been frequent confusion between the names Ceutorhynchus obstrictus (Marsham, 1802) and Ceutorhynchus assimilis (Paykull, 1792). Both are separate species and both are common in Europe, with C. obstrictus being on average slightly larger (typically 3–4 mm). The species found in North America has long been referred to as Ceutorhynchus assimilis, but it is now generally accepted that it is C. obstrictus and that C. assimilis does not occur in North America.

Ceutorhynchus assimilis (Paykull, 1792) was originally described as Curculio assimilis by Paykull, a name which had been already assigned to another species by Fabricius in 1775. As a junior primary homonym, Paykull's name should be invalid, but the International Commission on Zoological Nomenclature suppressed Fabricius' name and preserved Paykull's name. Ceutorhynchus assimilis (Paykull, 1792) is the type species of the genus Ceutorhynchus, it is sometimes referred to as Ceuthorrhynchus pleurostigma Stephens, 1829, a junior synonym.

== Biology ==
The adults of Ceutorhynchus obstrictus are 2.5–4 mm long, dark grey to black and covered with fine white scales. The snout is distinctly curved. Other features distinguishing it from related species include the morphology of the antennae, the hind femora and the tarsi.

The adults emerge in spring from their hibernating sites in the ground when temperatures reach 10-15 °C. They feed on various Brassicaceae for several weeks until canola begins to flower. After migrating to canola fields, the adults feed again, mate and females start laying eggs into the developing seed pods.

Eggs hatch after about a week. There are 3 larval instars which feed on the developing seeds inside the pods. The 3 larval stages develop over 2–4 weeks, during which time each larva feeds on and destroys up to 6 canola seeds. Upon completing their development, the larvae chew an exit hole through the wall of the seedpod, drop to the ground and pupate in the soil, about 1–2 cm below the surface. Pupation is completed after around 10 days. The young adults then emerge from the soil, disperse and feed. In autumn, they migrate to a hibernation site, for example a shelterbelt at the edge of the field, where they spent the winter in the soil or under litter on the ground. There is only one generation per year.

== Damage and Management ==
The adults feed on many species of crucifers, but females breed mainly on plants with large seedpods. Economic damage is highest for crops grown for seed production. In North America, infestations often exceed 25% of the rapeseed/canola pods having exit holes and yield losses on canola have been estimated at 5-30%.

Management still relies mainly on the application of chemical pesticides, but progress has been made on alternative control methods. The latter include cultural control methods like planting a trap crop as strips around a large field where the weevils in the strips are killed with insecticides. Alternatively, crop rotation and planting weevil-resistant cultivars can be used. In Europe many natural enemies like parasitoids and predators of C. obstrictus are known, but in North America, relatively few efforts have been directed at classical biological control, that is the collection of suitable strains of parasitoids and predators in Europe and their release in North America. There is a need to revive these efforts.
