= Mordellina ancilla =

Scientific classification
- Domain: Eukaryota
- Kingdom: Animalia
- Phylum: Arthropoda
- Class: Insecta
- Order: Coleoptera
- Suborder: Polyphaga
- Infraorder: Cucujiformia
- Family: Mordellidae
- Tribe: Mordellini
- Genus: Mordellina
- Species: M. ancilla

Binomial name
- Mordellina ancilla (LeConte, 1862)

Synonyms
- Mordellistena andreae ancilla LeConte, 1862; Mordellistena andreae ustulata LeConte, 1862; Mordellistena rufa Liljeblad, 1917; Mordellistena ustulata (LeConte, 1862); Mordellistena varians LeConte, 1862

Species of beetle

Mordellina ancilla is a species of tumbling flower beetle in the family Mordellidae. It is found in North America.
