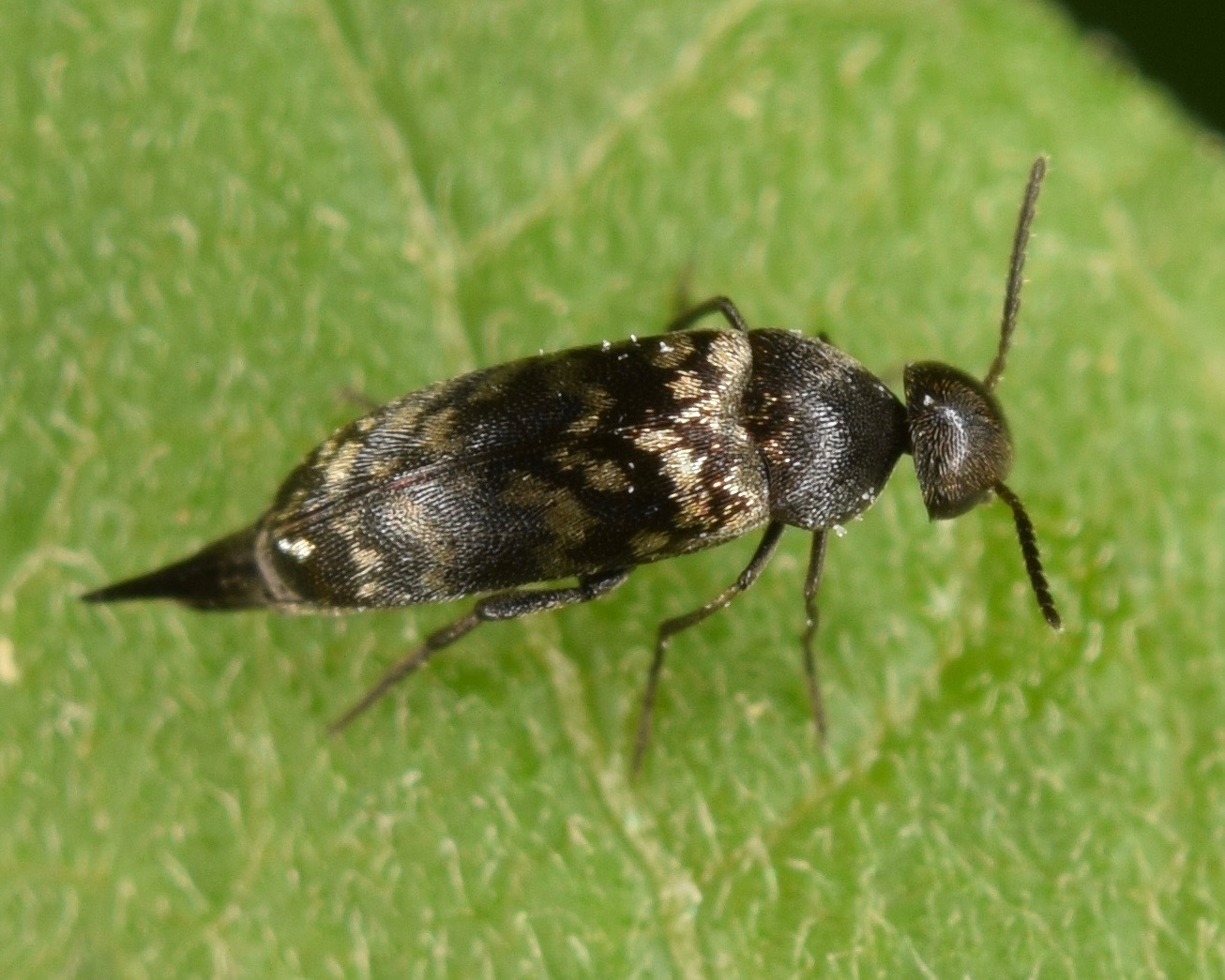
- Mordellina pustulata, Georgia

Scientific classification
- Domain: Eukaryota
- Kingdom: Animalia
- Phylum: Arthropoda
- Class: Insecta
- Order: Coleoptera
- Suborder: Polyphaga
- Infraorder: Cucujiformia
- Family: Mordellidae
- Subfamily: Mordellinae
- Tribe: Mordellini
- Genus: Mordellina; Schilsky, 1908

Type species
- Mordellina gracilis Schilsky, 1908

= Mordellina =

Genus of beetles

Mordellina is a genus of tumbling flower beetles in the family Mordellidae. There are more than 30 described species in Mordellina.

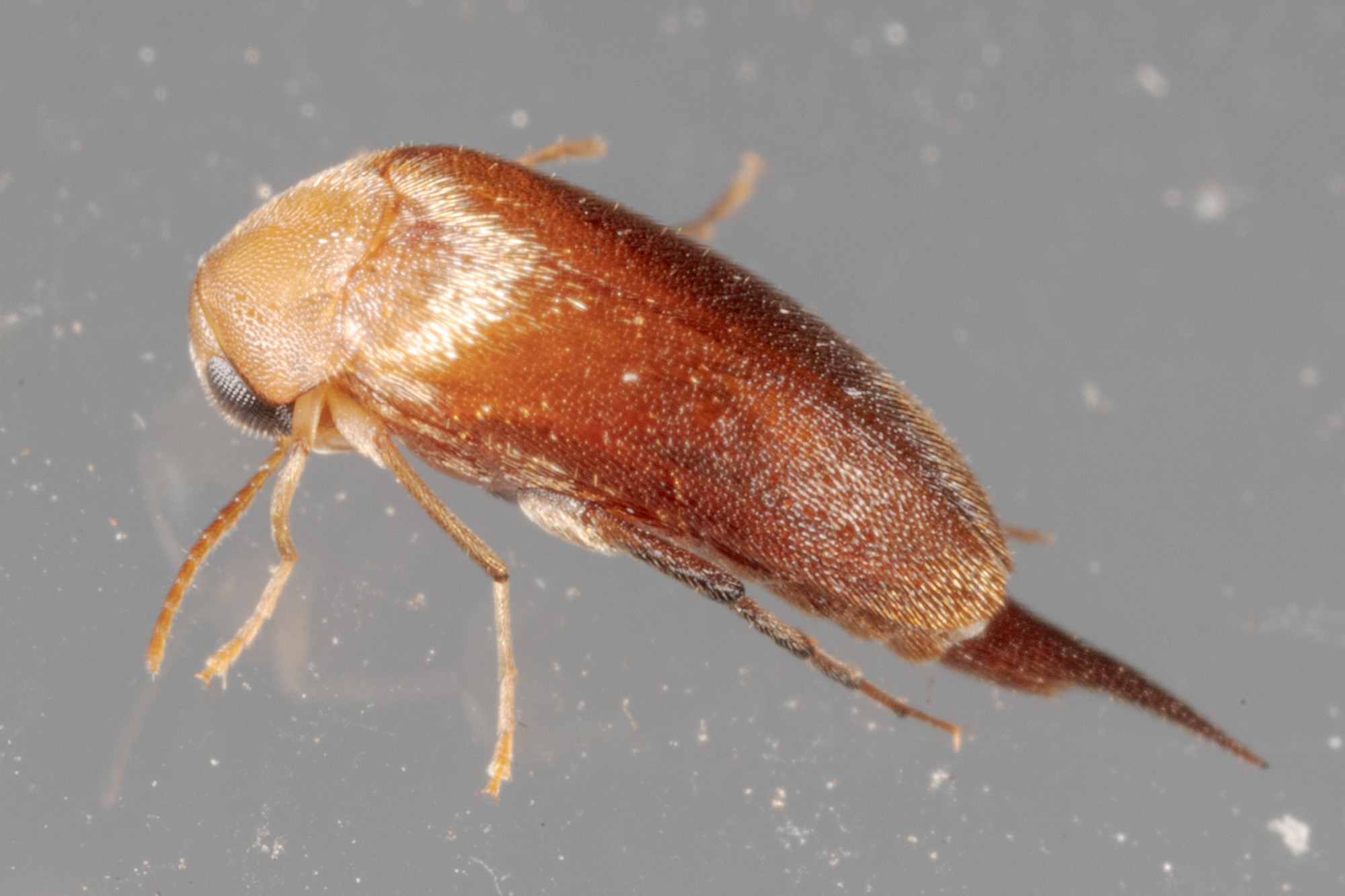
Mordellina testacea, Texas

== Species ==
These 34 species belong to the genus Mordellina, according to GBIF and BioLib, as well as (Hájek 2012).

- Mordellina amamiensis (Nomura, 1951)
- Mordellina ancilla (LeConte, 1862)
- Mordellina andreae (LeConte, 1862)
- Mordellina atrofusca (Nomura, 1951)
- Mordellina blatchleyi (Liljeblad, 1945)
- Mordellina curtepicalis (Pic, 1926)
- Mordellina floridensis (Smith, 1882)
- Mordellina gina Nomura, 1967
- Mordellina guttulata (Helmuth, 1864)
- Mordellina impatiens (LeConte, 1862)
- Mordellina infima (LeConte, 1862)
- Mordellina janae Horák, Farkac & Nakládal, 2012
- Mordellina kaguyahime (Nomura & Kato, 1957)
- Mordellina kimurai Tsuru, 2021
- Mordellina lecontei (Ermisch, 1953)
- Mordellina marginalis Nomura, 1967
- Mordellina minutalis (Liljeblad, 1945)
- Mordellina nigricans (Melsheimer, 1846)
- Mordellina paiwana Nomura, 1967
- Mordellina parva (Liljeblad, 1945)
- Mordellina pilosella (Ray, 1947)
- Mordellina pilosovittata (Nakane, 1956)
- Mordellina purcharti Horák, Farkac & Nakládal, 2012
- Mordellina pustulata (Melsheimer, 1846)
- Mordellina quadrinotata (Liljeblad, 1921)
- Mordellina rufohumeralis Nomura, 1967
- Mordellina semiusta (LeConte, 1862)
- Mordellina signatella (Marseul, 1876)
- Mordellina stastnyi Horák, Farkac & Nakládal, 2012
- Mordellina testacea (Blatchley, 1910)
- Mordellina tsutsuii (Nakane, 1956)
- Mordellina washingtonensis Steury & Steiner, 2020
- Mordellina wickhami (Liljeblad, 1945)
- Mordellina wimbledon Steury & Steiner, 2020
