= Ceutorhynchus elegans =

Scientific classification
- Domain: Eukaryota
- Kingdom: Animalia
- Phylum: Arthropoda
- Class: Insecta
- Order: Coleoptera
- Suborder: Polyphaga
- Infraorder: Cucujiformia
- Family: Curculionidae
- Genus: Ceutorhynchus
- Species: C. elegans

Binomial name
- Ceutorhynchus elegans Korotyaev, 1980

Species of beetle

Ceutorhynchus elegans is a species of true weevils in the tribe Ceutorhynchini. It has a palaearctic distribution.
