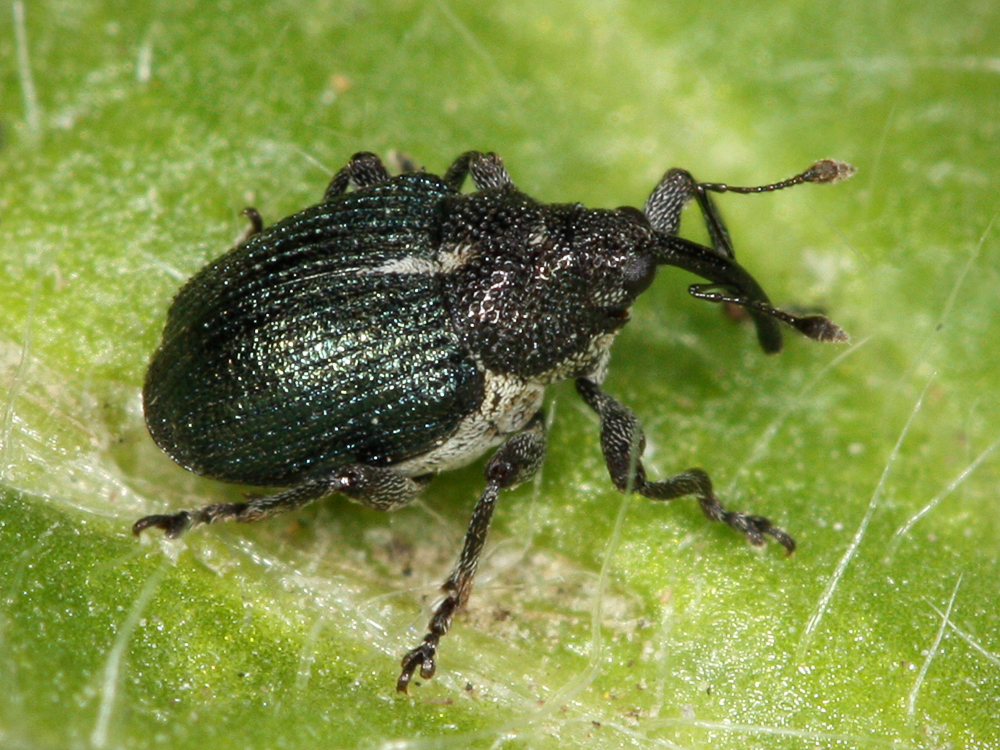
- Ceutorhynchus americanus

Scientific classification
- Kingdom: Animalia
- Phylum: Arthropoda
- Class: Insecta
- Order: Coleoptera
- Suborder: Polyphaga
- Infraorder: Cucujiformia
- Family: Curculionidae
- Tribe: Ceutorhynchini
- Genus: Ceutorhynchus; Germar, 1824

Species
- about 850, including: see list List of Ceutorhynchus species: Ceutorhynchus americanus; Ceutorhynchus elegans

= Ceutorhynchus =

Genus of beetles

Ceutorhynchus is a genus of true weevils in the tribe Ceutorhynchini. There are at least 400 described species in Ceutorhynchus.

Ceutorhynchus succinus Legalov, 2013 is a species from the Eocene of Europe found in Baltic amber.

== See also ==
- List of Ceutorhynchus species
