= Lineatin =

Names
- Preferred IUPAC name (1R,2S,5R,7S)-1,3,3-Trimethyl-4,6-dioxatricyclo[3.3.1.0^{2,7}]nonane

Identifiers
CAS Number	65035-34-9
3D model (JSmol)	Interactive image
ChemSpider	10396833
PubChem CID	15974546
UNII	28ENL65Z06
CompTox Dashboard (EPA)	DTXSID301028488
- InChI: InChI=1S/C10H16O2/c1-9(2)8-6-4-10(8,3)5-7(11-6)12-9/h6-8H,4-5H2,1-3H3/t6-,7-,8+,10-/m1/s1 Key: SHTFZHTWSLHVEB-BDNRQGISSA-N; InChI=1/C10H16O2/c1-9(2)8-6-4-10(8,3)5-7(11-6)12-9/h6-8H,4-5H2,1-3H3/t6-,7-,8+,10-/m1/s1 Key: SHTFZHTWSLHVEB-BDNRQGISBU
- SMILES: C[C@]12C[C@@H]3[C@H]1C(O[C@H](C2)O3)(C)C

Properties
Chemical formula	C_{10}H_{16}O_{2}
Molar mass	168.2 g/mol
- Except where otherwise noted, data are given for materials in their standard state (at 25 °C [77 °F], 100 kPa). verify (what is ?) Infobox references

Lineatin is a pheromone produced by female striped ambrosia beetle, Trypodendron lineatum Olivier. These kinds of beetles are responsible for extensive damage of coniferous forest infestation in Europe and North America. Since lineatin can act as lures used for mass-trapping of T. lineatum, it is being studied to apply as a pest control reagent.

== Structure ==
Lineatin was first isolated in 1977 by MacConnell. The absolute configuration of the biologically active form was later determined as (+)-(1R,4S,5R,7R)-3,3,7-trimethyl-2,9- dioxatricyclo[3.3.1.0^{4,7}]nonane, whereas other enatinomers process no biological attraction activity.

== Total Synthesis ==
After the absolute structure was determined, lineatin quickly attracted considerable synthetic interests due to its natural occurrence, biological activity, and unique structural features. A few routes describing the total synthesis of lineatin was proposed with yields of 0.5–2%. Recently, a new total synthesis route that adopted a photochemical [2 + 2] cycloaddition approach to construct diastereoselective cyclobutene and a regiocontrolled oxymercuration reaction was proposed. This route achieved in synthesizing highly pure (+)-lineatin (> 99.5% ee) through 14 steps and resulted in 14% overall yield from a homochiral 2(5H)-furanone. (Figure 1 showed the basic outline of this approach).

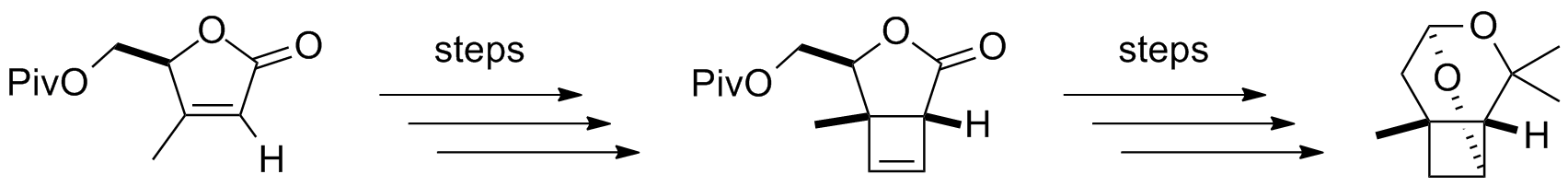
Figure 1: Lineatin total synthesis

== Biosynthesis ==
Lineatin is a monoterprene with unique tricyclic acetal structure. Most of the studies regarding lineatin were focused on the total synthesis; little attentions were put on its biosynthesis. It is suggested that lineatin is derived through oxidation and cyclization of a monoterponid precursor, but no experimental has been done on proving this route. Based on its partial structure similarity to iridoid class of terprenoids, here, a possible biosynthesis pathway was proposed and outlined in figure 2.

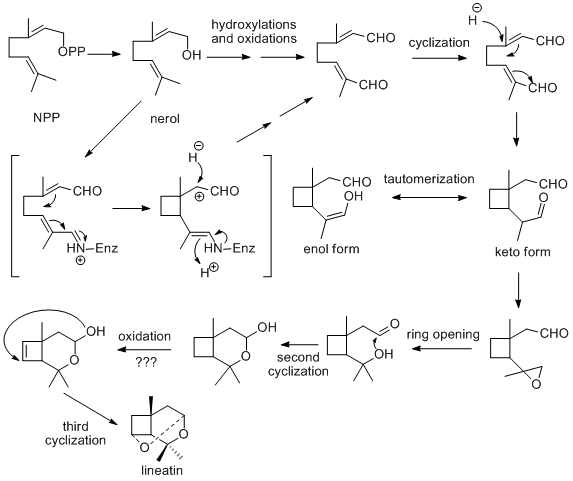
Figure 2: Proposed lineatin biosynthesis pathway.
