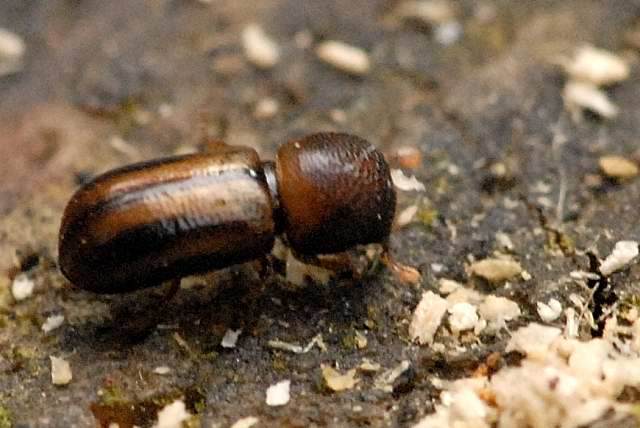
- Trypodendron lineatum

Scientific classification
- Kingdom: Animalia
- Phylum: Arthropoda
- Clade: Pancrustacea
- Class: Insecta
- Order: Coleoptera
- Suborder: Polyphaga
- Infraorder: Cucujiformia
- Superfamily: Curculionoidea
- Family: Curculionidae
- Subfamily: Scolytinae
- Tribe: Scolytini
- Genus: Trypodendron; Stephens, 1830

Synonyms
- Xyloteres (Ferrari, 1867); Xyloterus (Erichson, 1836)

= Trypodendron =

Genus of beetles

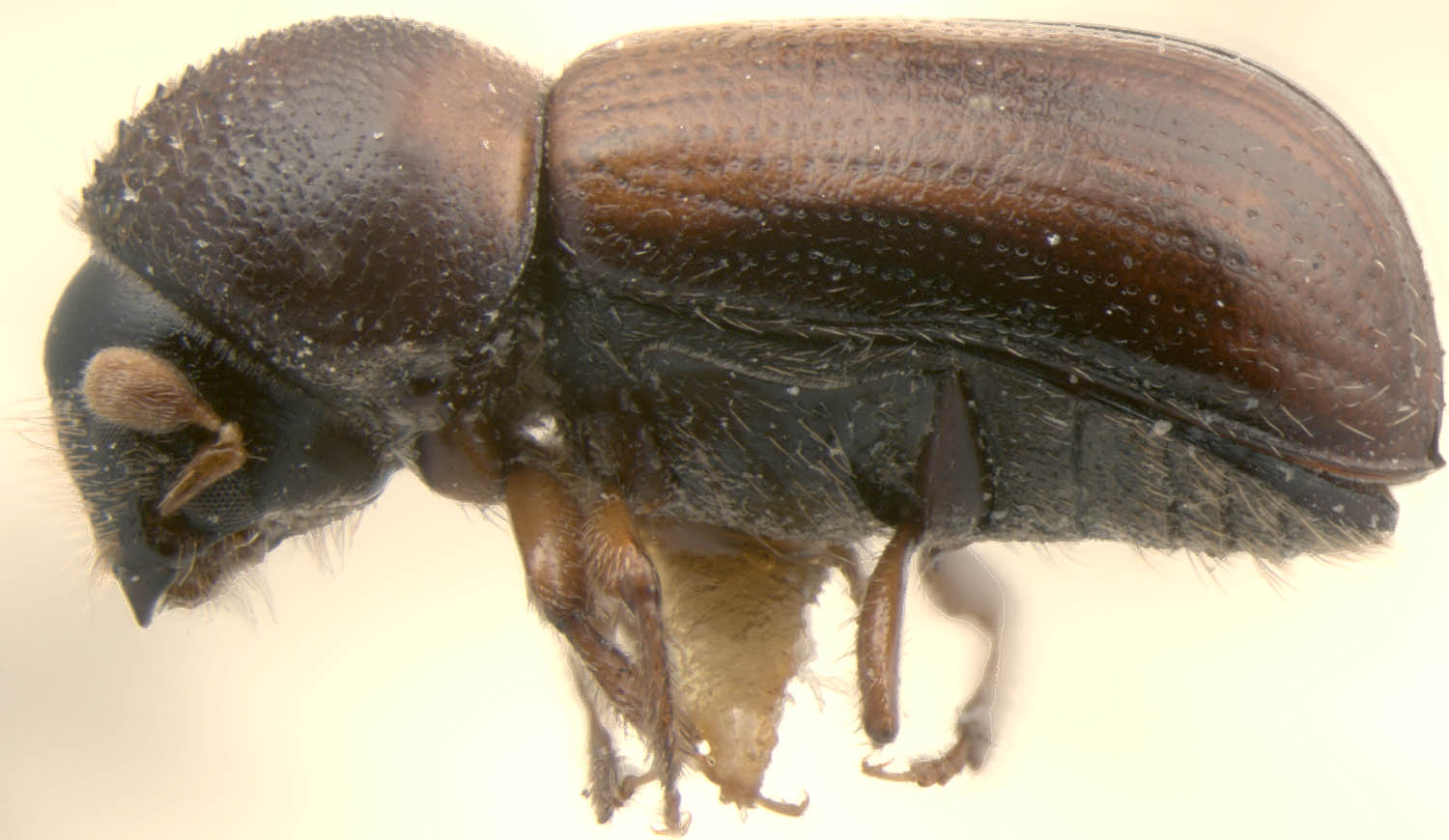
Trypodendron lineatum

Trypodendron is a genus of ambrosia beetles of the family Curculionidae. There are at least 30 described species in Trypodendron.

Some species have reached pest status because they attack freshly sawn timber and degrade the wood.

== Species ==
These 35 species belong to the genus Trypodendron:

- Trypodendron apicalis Endrödi, 1957a^{c}
- Trypodendron ashuensis Wood & Bright, 1992^{c}
- Trypodendron betulae Swaine, 1911^{i c b} (birch ambrosia beetle)
- Trypodendron borealis Swaine, J.M., 1917^{c}
- Trypodendron dispar Stephens, 1830^{c}
- Trypodendron domesticum Stephens, 1830^{c g b} (European hardwood ambrosia beetle)
- Trypodendron dorjitenzingi Schmutzenhofer, 1988c^{c}
- Trypodendron gaimaensis Wood & Bright, 1992^{c}
- Trypodendron granulatum Eggers, 1933f^{c}
- Trypodendron laeve Eggers, 1939c^{c}
- Trypodendron lineatum (Olivier)^{i c g b} (striped ambrosia beetle)
- Trypodendron lineellus Endrödi, 1957a^{c}
- Trypodendron majus Eggers, 1926b^{c}
- Trypodendron melanocephalus auctt.,^{c}
- Trypodendron mericionale Endrödi, 1957b^{c}
- Trypodendron meridionale Eggers, 1940g^{c}
- Trypodendron nigrum Sokanovskii, B.V., 1954^{c}
- Trypodendron niponicum Blandford, 1894d^{c}
- Trypodendron obtusum Eggers, 1939c^{c}
- Trypodendron pauper Endrödi, 1957a^{c}
- Trypodendron piceum Strand, A., 1946b^{c}
- Trypodendron ponderosae Swaine, J.M., 1917^{c}
- Trypodendron proximum Wood & Bright, 1992^{c}
- Trypodendron pubipennis Blandford, 1894d^{c}
- Trypodendron pulchellum Wood & Bright, 1992^{c}
- Trypodendron retusum Wood & Bright, 1992^{c b} (poplar ambrosia beetle)
- Trypodendron rufitarsis Swaine, J.M., 1917^{c}
- Trypodendron scabricollis Wood & Bright, 1992^{c b}
- Trypodendron signatum (Fabricius, J.C., 1792)^{c g}
- Trypodendron sinensis Eggers, 1941b^{c}
- Trypodendron sordidus Blandford, 1894c^{c}
- Trypodendron suturale Eggers, 1933f^{c}
- Trypodendron toracalis Endrödi, 1957a^{c}
- Trypodendron tropicus Browne, 1950b^{c}
- Trypodendron vittiger Eichhoff, 1881a^{c}

Data sources: i = ITIS, c = Catalogue of Life, g = GBIF, b = Bugguide.net
