= Trypodendron betulae =

Scientific classification
- Kingdom: Animalia
- Phylum: Arthropoda
- Clade: Pancrustacea
- Class: Insecta
- Order: Coleoptera
- Suborder: Polyphaga
- Infraorder: Cucujiformia
- Family: Curculionidae
- Genus: Trypodendron
- Species: T. betulae

Binomial name
- Trypodendron betulae Swaine, 1911

Species of beetle

Trypodendron betulae, the birch ambrosia beetle, is a species of typical bark beetle in the family Curculionidae. It is found in North America. It has a symbiotic relationship with Ambrosiella fungi.
