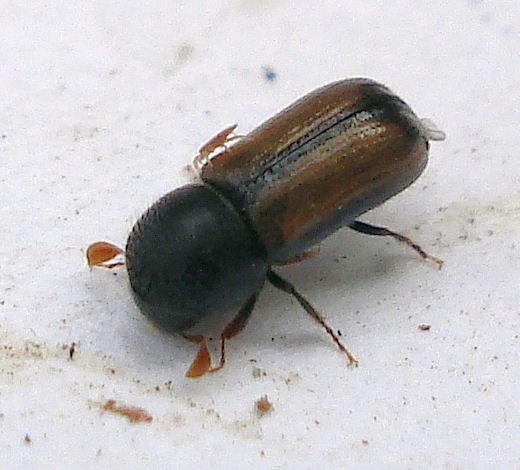
- Trypodendron domesticum figure 12

Scientific classification
- Kingdom: Animalia
- Phylum: Arthropoda
- Class: Insecta
- Order: Coleoptera
- Suborder: Polyphaga
- Infraorder: Cucujiformia
- Family: Curculionidae
- Genus: Trypodendron
- Species: T. domesticum

Binomial name
- Trypodendron domesticum (Linnaeus, 1758)

= Trypodendron domesticum =

Species of beetle

Trypodendron domesticum is a species of weevil native to Europe.
