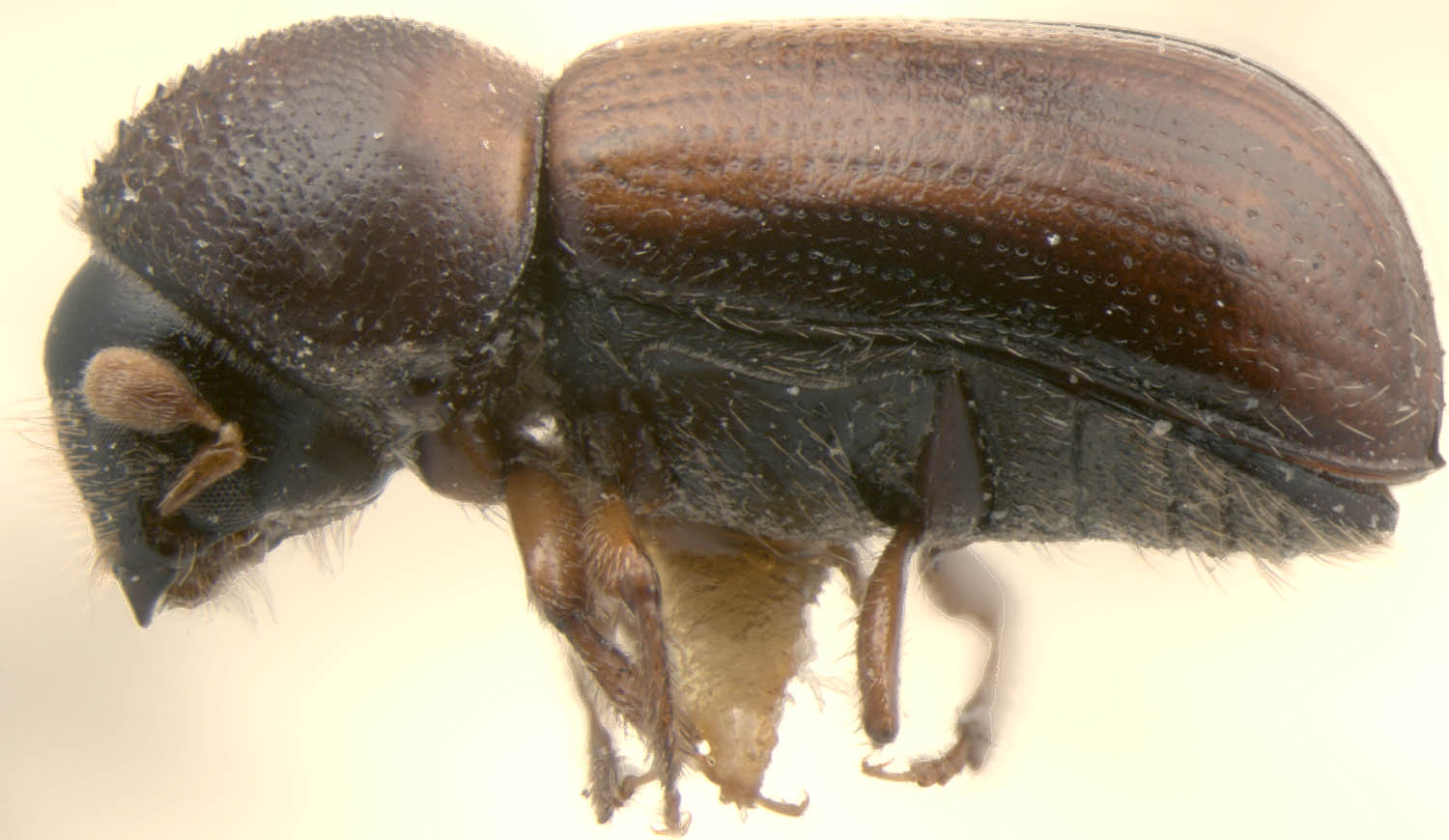

Scientific classification
- Kingdom: Animalia
- Phylum: Arthropoda
- Clade: Pancrustacea
- Class: Insecta
- Order: Coleoptera
- Suborder: Polyphaga
- Infraorder: Cucujiformia
- Superfamily: Curculionoidea
- Family: Curculionidae
- Subfamily: Scolytinae
- Genus: Trypodendron
- Species: T. lineatum

Binomial name
- Trypodendron lineatum (Olivier)

= Trypodendron lineatum =

Species of beetle

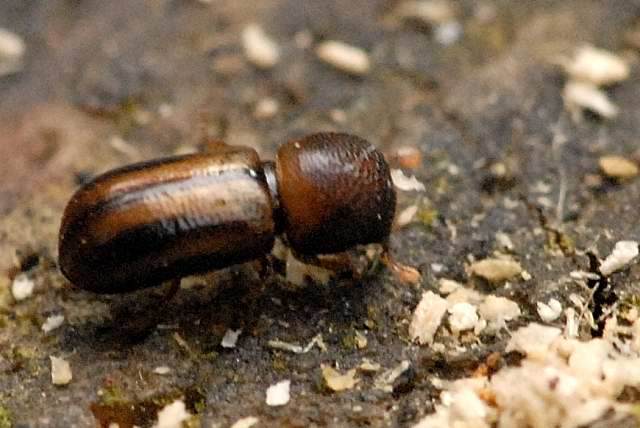
Striped ambrosia beetle, Trypodendron lineatum

Trypodendron lineatum, known generally as striped ambrosia beetle, is a species of typical bark beetle in the family Curculionidae. Other common names include the two-striped timber beetle, conifer ambrosia beetle, and spruce timber beetle. It is a woodboring beetle that cultivates symbiotic fungi inside galleries in the xylem of primarily conifer trees, which serve as the main food source for developing larvae. The species has a Holarctic distribution as a major forest pest.

== Taxonomy and nonmenclature ==
Trypodendron lineatum was first described in 1795 by Olivier, who is a prominent naturalist known for his work on beetles. It belongs to the genus Trypodendron, which includes several ambrosia-beetle species associated with conifer and hardwood hosts. Standard taxonomic references and regional checklists place T. lineatum among the principal conifer-associated ambrosia beetles in Eurasia and North America.

== Description ==
Eggs of T. lineatum are white and translucent, approximately 1.00mm in length. The larval stage is undistinguished, small white grubs, followed by the change into the adult stage inside the gallery system. Adults average 3.5mm in length by 1.5mm in width, and are brown to black with two lighter-colored longitudinal strips on each elytron, given their "striped" name. In the front, the head and thorax of the female are rounded, while the head of the male is dished out and the thorax is straight across. Males usually have smaller body sizes compared to females.

== Distribution and habitat ==
T. lineatum has a Holarctic distribution, including Europe, northern Asia, North Africa in some accounts, and North America. The beetle preferentially infests almost any coniferous hosts, particularly when trees are stressed or dying, but has also been recorded from four genera of deciduous trees: Alnus, Berula, and Malus and Acer. Colonization into winter-felled or naturally killed conifers happens in the spring when the temperature for flight is about 16 °C. The female beetles can bore directly through the bark, excavating their galleries in the moist sapwood.

== Biology and life cycle ==
As an ambrosia beetle, T. lineatum has evolved an obligate, mutualistic relationship with fungi, which is central to its life history. The beetle larvae are entirely dependent on cultivated fungi, which metabolize wood and provide nutrients, steroids, and vitamins. The primary nutritional mutualist is the fungus Phialophoropsis ferruginea, whose spores are transported by the beetles in specialized structures and are inoculated into the wood of host trees, creating a sustainable food source for larvae development. In return, they develop specialized structures called mycangia to provide nutrition to fungi.
The annual cycle of T. lineatum is marked by two distinct dispersal flights, though the most characteristic thing is the spectacular springtime "swarming flight". This mass emergence occurs as the temperatures rise above 16 °C. Daily flight starts in late morning, reaching a peak by mid-afternoon, and the numbers reduced sharply in late afternoon. These new brood beetles, having overwintered, are attracted to suitable host logs by odour. The primary attractant is ethanol, which accumulates to high concentrations in dead or dying trees. Upon locating a host, female pioneers initiate galleries into the sapwood, and the accumulating white frass on the bark is often the first visible sign of infestation for forestry workers.
Colonization is rapidly amplified by a female-produced aggregation pheromone, lineatin. This pheromone attracts both males and females into the log, leading to mating on its surface. The male then follows the female into the gallery, where his role of removing boring dust can increase reproductive success. Pair female will produce eggs nearly as twice as many as unpaired females', and the eggs will be laied in individual niches sealed with boring dust. Upon hatching, the larvae will feed on the wood fibers and on the hyphae of the ambrosia fungi incoculated by the parents.
Following development, the new brood adults emerge sporadically throughout the summer. Their initial dispersal flight is strongly photopositive, carrying them up and away from the log. They are then passively transported downwind, often over distances of 300 meters or more, into forested margins. Here, they settle in the forest floor or at the base of stumps to overwinter. This late-summer flight is less noticeable than the spring swarm. All new brood beetles must overwinter to reach sexual maturity, after which they will join the swarming flight the following spring to begin a fresh cycle.

== Economic and ecological importance ==
Although T. lineatum primarily colonizes dead or dying wood, playing a role in decomposition and nutrient cycling in nature, it can reduce commercial wood quality through staining and gallery formation, downgrading the value and causing direct economic losses. Even more, the prejudice against the purchase and application of pin-holed lumber can lead to further indirect losses.

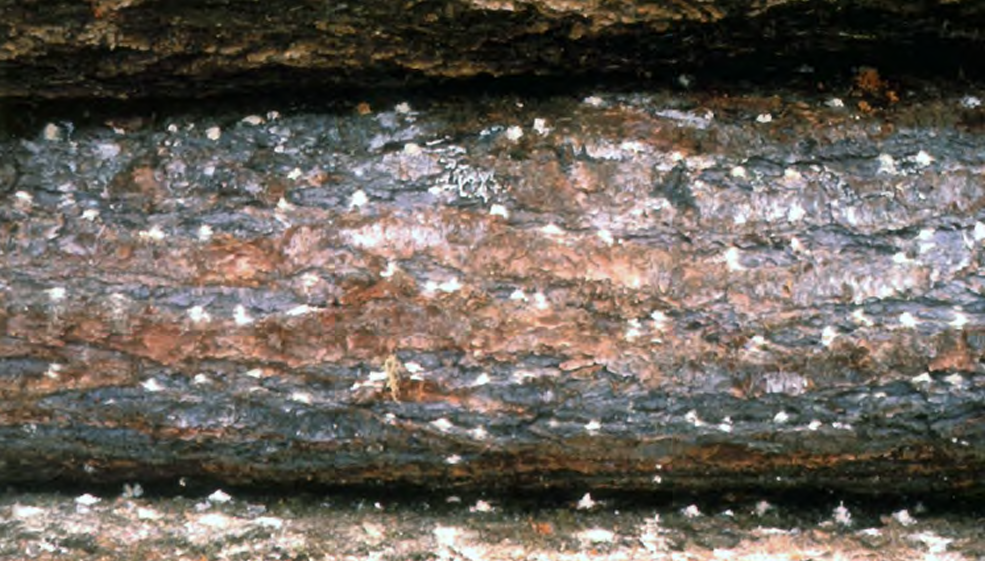
Piles of white boring dust indicate ambrosia beetle attacks

== Management and monitoring ==
The species is attracted to host volatiles indicative of stressed or recently dead wood, especially ethanol and conifer monoterpenes such as α-pinene. It is also responsive to a species-specific pheromone, lineatin, which is used in monitoring and trapping studies. Effective monitoring commonly employs traps baited with the pheromone lineatin and/or ethanol and α-pinene. The trap type and lure combination can affect catch efficacy. Integrated pest management recommendations include removal and processing of windthrown or harvested wood, timely debarking or storage measures, and the application of traps for tracking of susceptible stands. Greater effort during beetles' flight seasons can offer better protections. However, the method of controlling by using nature enemies has not been verified to be suitable yet.

== Research ==
Studies have investigated the sensory biology, olfactory repertoire, genome and fungal associations of T. lineatum, characterizing the interaction between a specialized ambrosia beetle with its host and fungi, and the relatively small chemoreceptor gene set with relation to its ecology.
