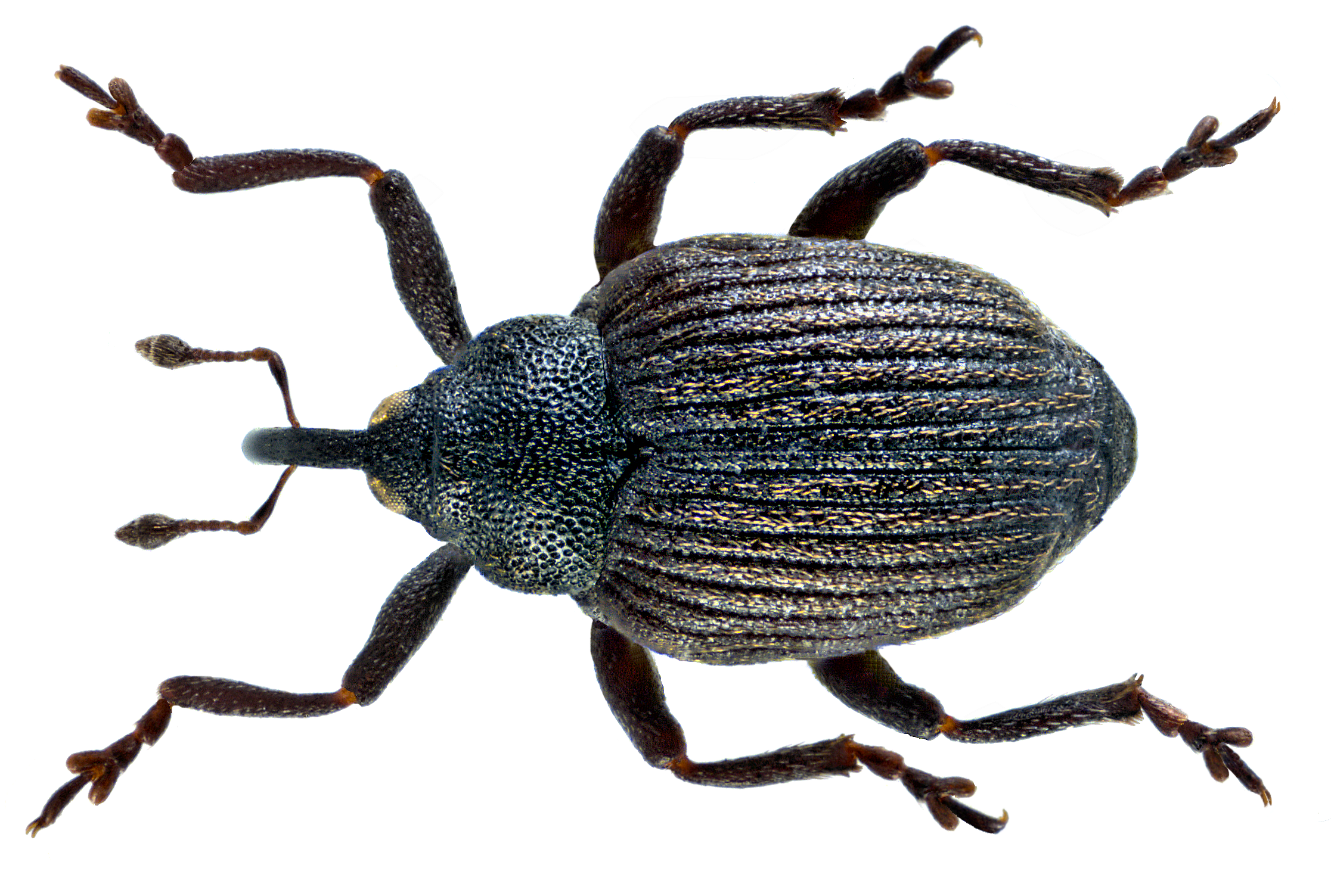
- Amalorrhynchus melanarius

Scientific classification
- Domain: Eukaryota
- Kingdom: Animalia
- Phylum: Arthropoda
- Class: Insecta
- Order: Coleoptera
- Suborder: Polyphaga
- Infraorder: Cucujiformia
- Family: Curculionidae
- Subfamily: Ceutorhynchinae; Gistel, 1848

Tribes
- Ceutorhynchini; Cnemogonini; Egriini; Hypurini; Lioxyonychini; Mecysmoderini; Mononychini; Phytobiini; Scleropterini

= Ceutorhynchinae =

Subfamily of beetles

Ceutorhynchinae is a subfamily of minute seed weevils in the family of beetles known as Curculionidae. There are at least 150 genera and more than 1000 described species in Ceutorhynchinae worldwide.

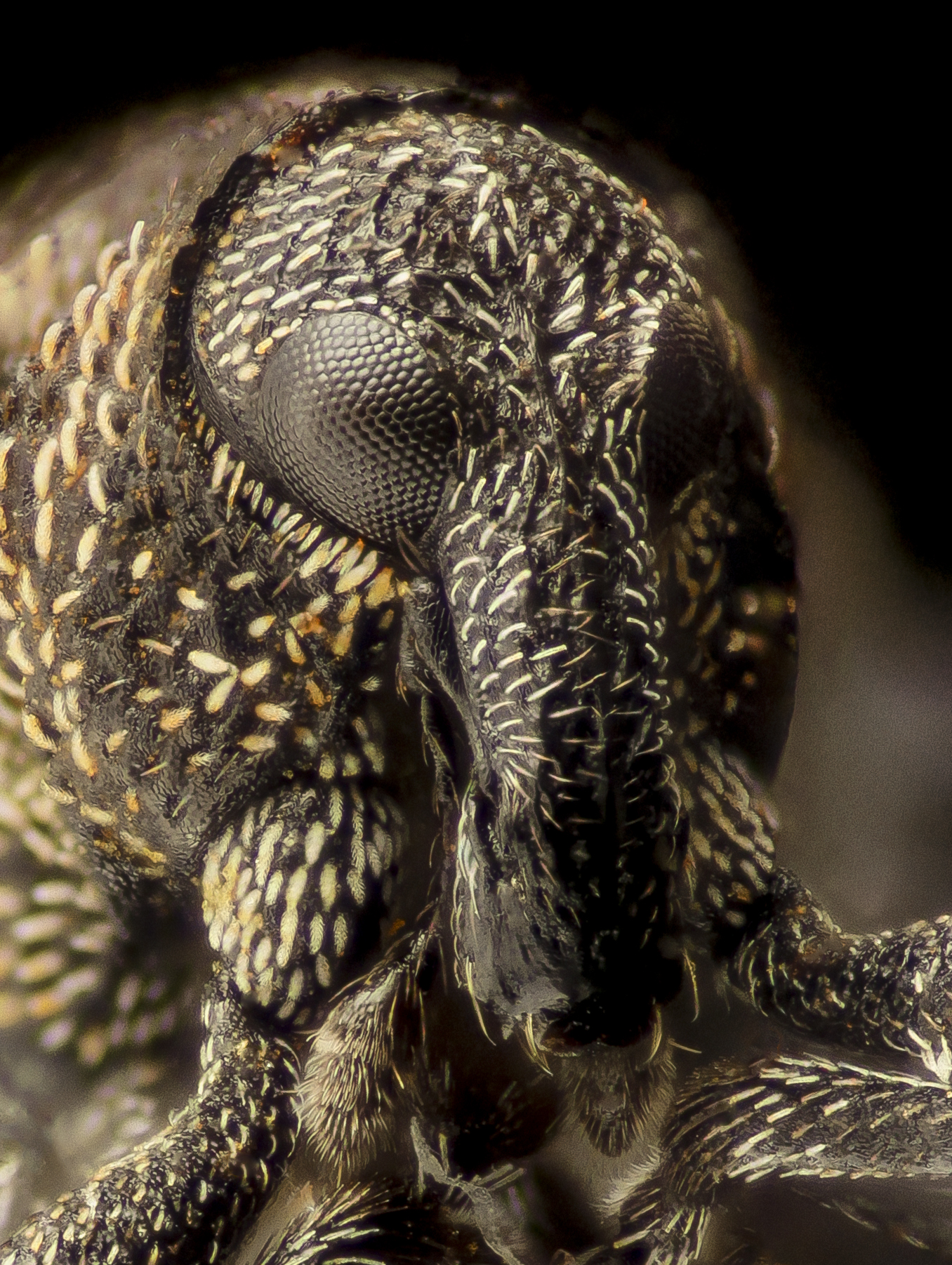
Rhinoncomimus latipes

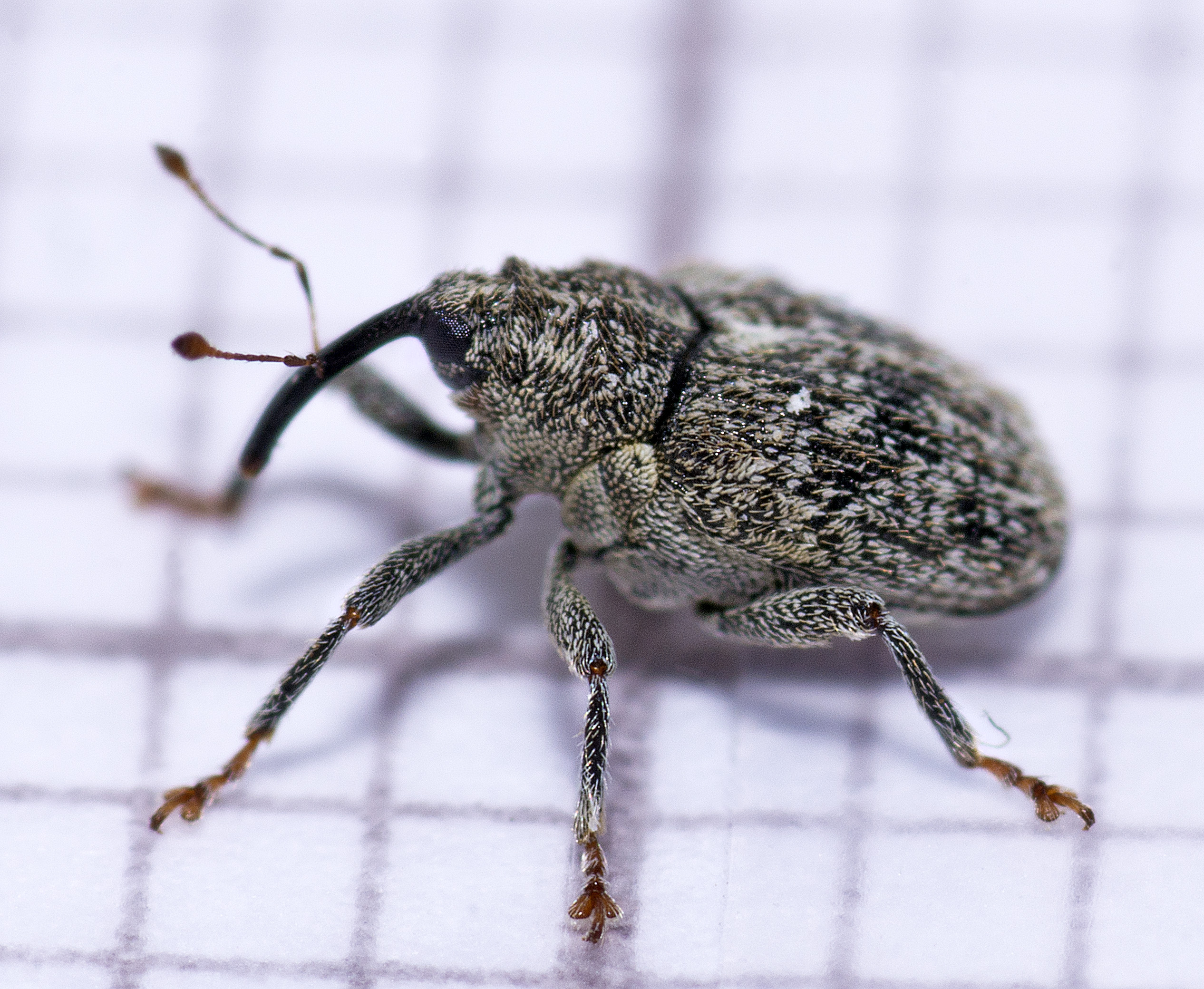
Ceutorhynchus pallidactylus, Cabbage Stem Weevil

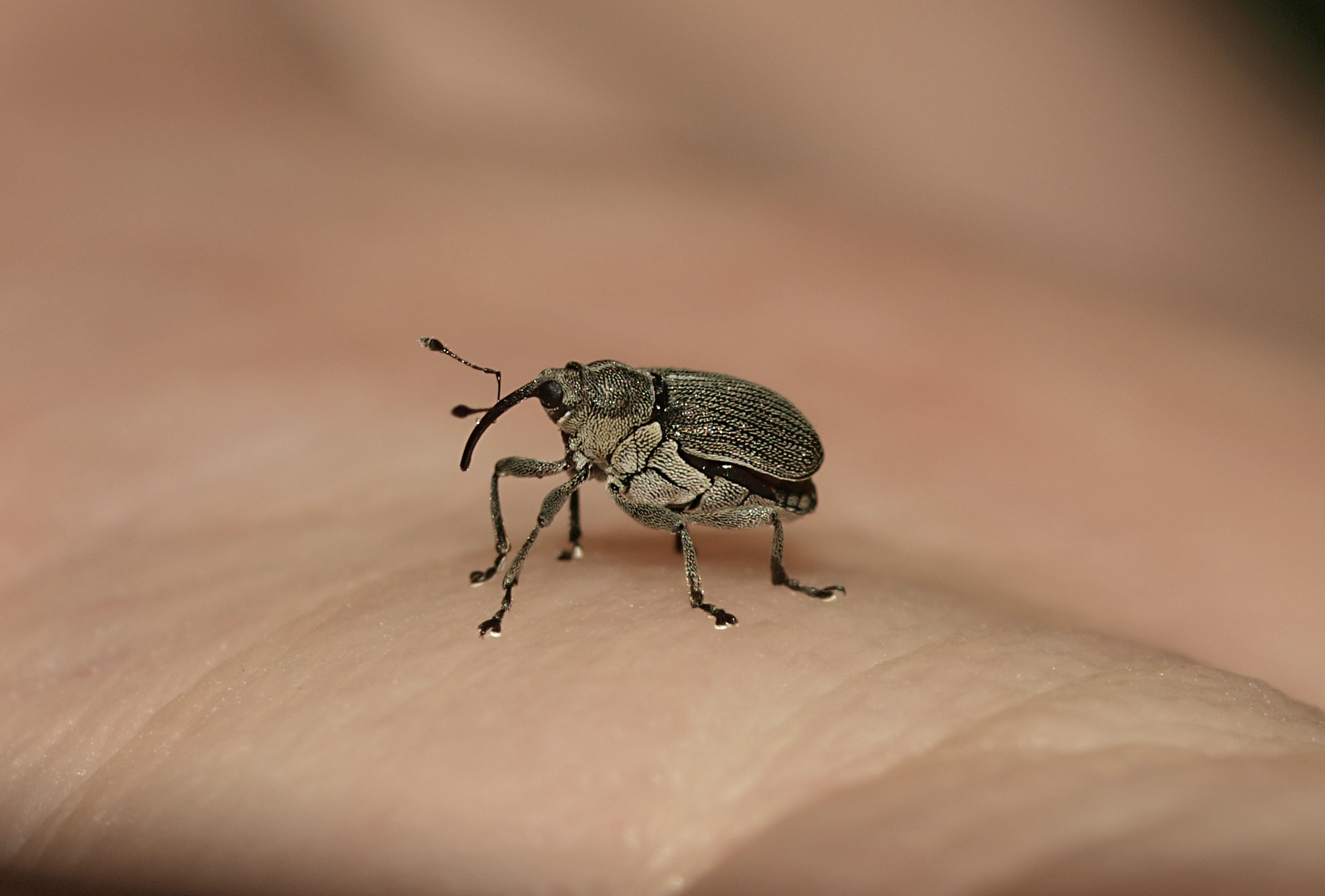
Ceutorhynchus obstrictus, Cabbage Seedpod Weevil

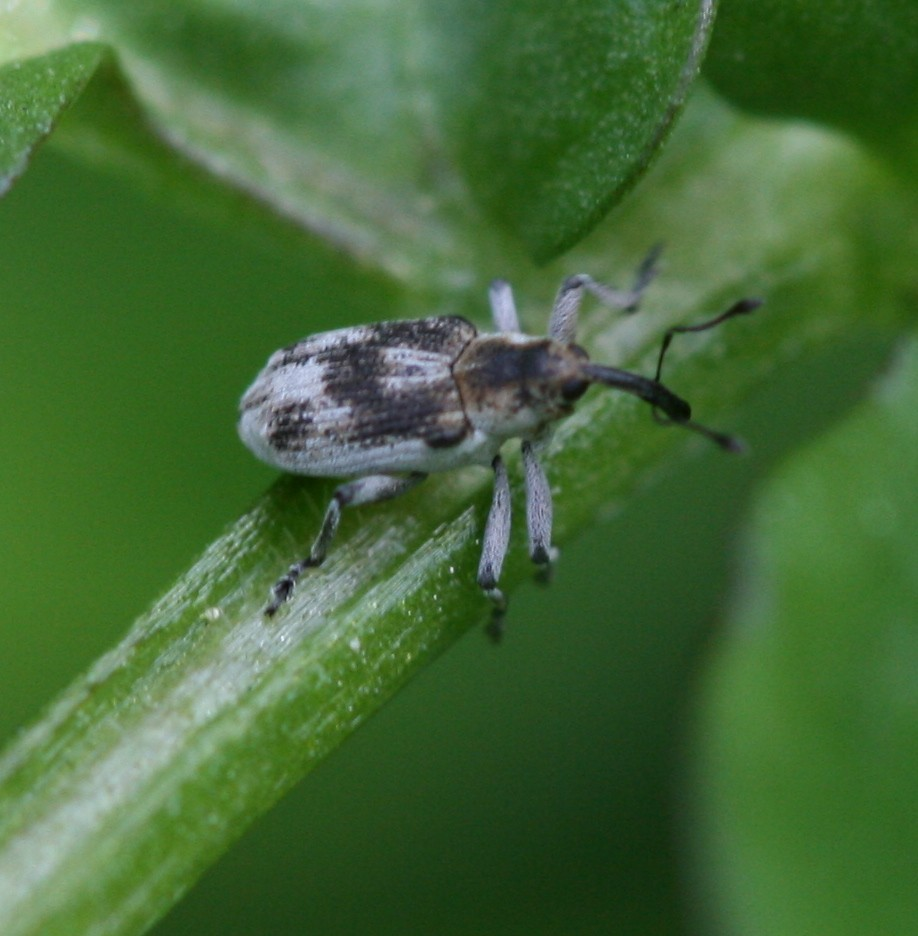
Poophagus sisymbrii

== Genera ==
These 150 genera belong to the subfamily Ceutorhynchinae:

- Acallodes LeConte, 1876^{i c g b}
- Acanthoscelidius Hustache, 1930^{i c g b}
- Allosirocalus Colonnelli, 1983^{c g b}
- Amalorrhynchus Reitter, 1913^{c g b}
- Amalus Schönherr, 1825^{i c g b}
- Amicroplontus^{c g}
- Amurocladus
- Angarocladus
- Anthypurinus^{c g}
- Aoxyonyx^{c g}
- Aphytobius^{c g}
- Asperauleutes^{b}
- Asperosoma Korotyaev, 1999^{g b}
- Augustinus^{c g}
- Auleutes Dietz, 1896^{i c g b}
- Barioxyonyx^{c g}
- Belonnotus^{c g}
- Bohemanius^{c g}
- Boragosirocalus^{c g}
- Brachiodontus^{c g}
- Brevicoeliodes
- Calosirus^{c g}
- Cardipennis
- Ceutorhynchoides^{c g}
- Ceutorhynchus Germar, 1824^{i c g b}
- Cnemogonus LeConte, 1876^{i c g b}
- Coeliastes^{c g}
- Coeliodes^{c g}
- Coeliodinus^{c g}
- Coeliosomus^{c g}
- Conocoeliodes^{c g}
- Craponius LeConte, 1876^{i c g b}
- Cyphauleutes^{c g}
- Cyphohypurus^{c g}
- Cyphosenus^{c g}
- Cysmemoderes^{c g}
- Datonychidius^{c g}
- Datonychus^{c g}
- Dieckmannius^{c g}
- Dietzella Champion, 1907^{i g b}
- Drupenatus
- Ectamnogaster^{c g}
- Egriodes^{c g}
- Egrius
- Eremonyx^{c g}
- Ericomicrelus^{c g}
- Ethelcus^{c g}
- Eubrychius C. G. Thomson, 1859^{i c g}
- Eucoeliodes
- Euhrychiopsis Dietz, 1896^{i g b}
- Euoxyonyx^{c g}
- Exocoeliodes^{c g}
- Fossoronyx
- Glocianus Reitter, 1916^{c g b}
- Gobicladus
- Hadroplontus C.G.Thomson, 1859^{c g b}
- Hemioxyonyx^{c g}
- Heorhynchus
- Hesperorrhynchus^{c g}
- Homorosoma Frivaldszky, 1894^{i c g b}
- Hovanegrius^{c g}
- Hypegrius^{c g}
- Hypocoeliodes Faust, 1896^{i c g}
- Hypohypurus^{c g}
- Hypurus Rey, 1882^{i c g b}
- Indicoplontus^{c g}
- Indohypurus^{c g}
- Indozacladus^{c g}
- Isorhynchus^{c g}
- Lioxyonyx^{c g}
- Macrosquamonyx
- Marmaropus^{c g}
- Mecysmoderes^{c g}
- Megahypurus^{c g}
- Mesoxyonyx^{c g}
- Metamerus^{c g}
- Micrelus^{c g}
- Microplontus Wagner, 1944^{c g b}
- Mogulones Reitter, 1916^{c g b}
- Mogulonoides^{c}
- Mononychites^{c g}
- Mononychus Germar, 1824^{i c g b}
- Nedyus Schönherr, 1825^{i c g b}
- Neocoeliodes^{c g}
- Neoglocianus^{c g}
- Neohypurus^{c g}
- Neophytobius Wagner, 1936^{i c g b}
- Neoplatygaster^{c g}
- Neoxyonyx^{c g}
- Neozacladus^{c g}
- Notegrius^{c g}
- Notoxyonyx^{c g}
- Odontocoeliodes^{c g}
- Oplitoxyonyx^{c g}
- Oprohinus^{c g}
- Orchestomerus Dietz, 1896^{c g b}
- Oreorrhynchaeus^{c g}
- Oxyonyx^{c g}
- Oxyonyxus^{c g}
- Panophthalmus^{c g}
- Paracoeliodes^{c g}
- Parauleutes Colonnelli, 2004^{g b}
- Parenthis Dietz, 1896^{i g b}
- Parethelcus^{c g}
- Paroxyonyx^{c g}
- Pelenomus C.G.Thomson, 1859^{c g b}
- Pelenosomus Dietz, 1896^{i c g b}
- Pericartius^{c g}
- Perigaster Dietz, 1896^{i c g b}
- Perigasteromimus Colonnelli, 1999^{c g b}
- Perioxyonyx
- Petrocladus
- Phoeniconyx^{c g}
- Phrydiuchus Gozis, 1885^{i c g b}
- Phytobiomorphus^{c g}
- Phytobius Schönherr, 1833^{i c g b}
- Platygasteronyx^{c g}
- Platypteronyx^{c g}
- Poophagus Schönherr, 1837^{i c g b}
- Prisistus Reitter, 1916^{c g b}
- Prorutidosoma Korotyaev, 1999^{g b}
- Pseudocoeliodes^{c g}
- Pseudophytobius^{c g}
- Pseudoxyonyx^{c g}
- Ranunculiphilus^{c g}
- Rhinoncomimus Wagner, 1940^{c g b}
- Rhinoncus Schönherr, 1825^{i c g b}
- Rileyonymus Dietz, 1896^{i c g b}
- Rutidosoma Stephens, 1831^{i c g}
- Scleropteroides^{c g}
- Scleropterus^{c g}
- Scythocladus
- Sinauleutes
- Sinocolus^{c g}
- Sirocalodes Voss, 1958^{i c g b}
- Stenocarus^{c g}
- Suboxyonyx^{c g}
- Tapeinotus^{c g}
- Tatyania^{c g}
- Thamiocolus^{c g}
- Theodorinus^{c g}
- Tibetiellus^{c g}
- Trachelanthus
- Trichocoeliodes^{c g}
- Tricholioxyonyx^{c g}
- Trichosirocalus Colonnelli, 1979^{i c g b}
- Wagnerinus^{c g}
- Xenysmoderes^{c g}
- Zacladius
- Zacladus^{c g}

Data sources: i = ITIS, c = Catalogue of Life, g = GBIF, b = Bugguide.net
