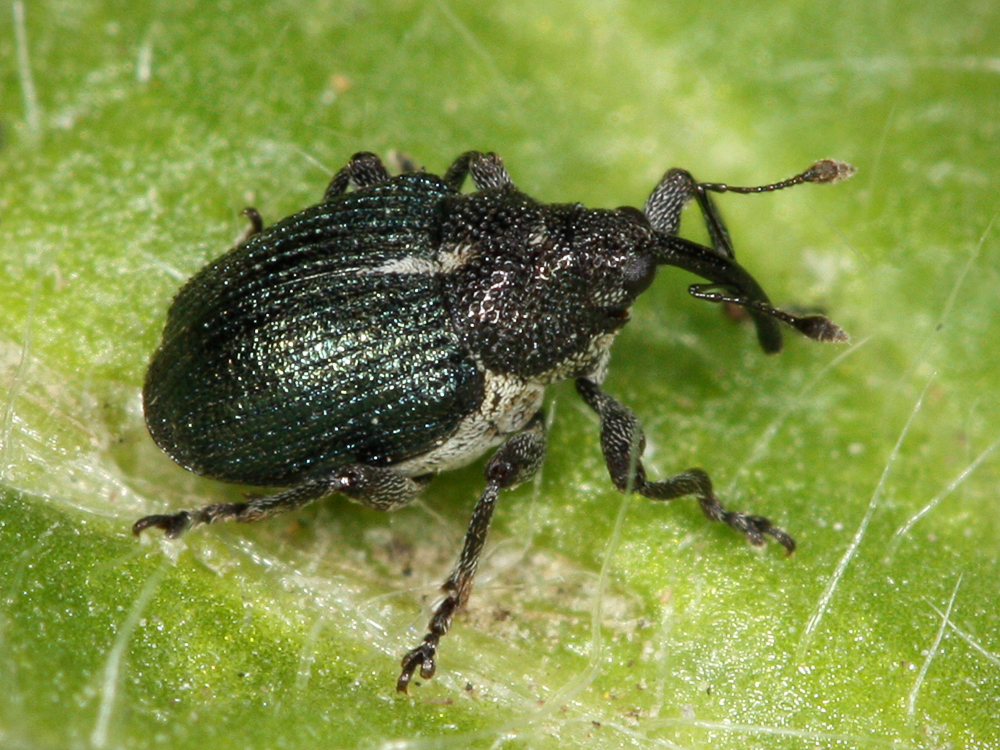
- Ceutorhynchus americanus

Scientific classification
- Domain: Eukaryota
- Kingdom: Animalia
- Phylum: Arthropoda
- Class: Insecta
- Order: Coleoptera
- Suborder: Polyphaga
- Infraorder: Cucujiformia
- Family: Curculionidae
- Subfamily: Ceutorhynchinae
- Tribe: Ceutorhynchini; Gistel, 1848

= Ceutorhynchini =

Tribe of beetles

Ceutorhynchini is a true weevil tribe in the subfamily Baridinae.

== Genera ==
The following genera are included:

- Aiphonsinus Korotyaev, 2001
- Allosirocalus Colonnelli, 1983
- Amalorrhynchus Reitter, 1913
- Amalus Schoenherr, 1825
- Amicroplontus Colonnelli, 1984
- Amurocladus Korotyaev, 1997
- Angarocladus Korotyaev, 1997
- Barioxyonyx Hustache, 1931
- Bohemanius Schultze, 1898
- Boragosirocalus Dieckmann, 1975
- Brevicoeliodes Korotyaev, 1997
- Calosirus Thomson, 1859
- Cardipennis Korotyaev, 1980
- Ceutorhynchoides Colonnelli, 1979
- Ceutorhynchus Germar, 1823
- Coeliastes Weise, 1883
- Coeliodes Schoenherr, 1837
- Coeliodinus Dieckmann, 1972
- Conocoeliodes Korotyaev, 1996
- Datonychidius Korotyaev, 1997
- Datonychus Wagner, 1944
- Dieckmannius Colonnelli, 1987
- Drupenatus Reitter, 1913
- Ectamnogaster Schultze, 1903
- Eremonyx Marshall, 1931
- Ericomicrelus Colonnelli, 1984
- Ethelcus Reitter, 1916
- Eucoeliodes Smreczynski, 1974
- Euoxyonyx Korotyaev, 1982
- Exocoeliodes Colonnelli, 1984
- Fossoronyx Korotyaev, 1982
- Glocianus Reitter, 1916
- Gobicladus Korotyaev, 1997
- Hadroplontus Thomson, 1859
- Hainokisaruzo Yoshitake & Colonnelli, 2005
- Hemioxyonyx Korotyaev, 1982
- Heorhynchus Korotyaev, 1999
- Hesperorrhynchus Peyerimhoff & P.de., 1926
- Indicoplontus Colonnelli, 1984
- Indozacladus Colonnelli, 1984
- Isorhynchus Schoenherr, 1833
- Macrosquamonyx Korotyaev, 1982
- Mesoxyonyx Korotyaev, 1997
- Micrelus Thomson, 1859
- Microplontus Wagner, 1944
- Mogulones Reitter, 1916
- Mogulonoides Colonnelli, 1986
- Nedyus Schoenherr, 1825
- Neocoeliodes Colonnelli, 1984
- Neoglocianus Dieckmann, 1972
- Neoxyonyx Hoffmann, 1930
- Neozacladus Bajtenov, 1981
- Notoxyonyx Colonnelli, 1995
- Odontocoeliodes Colonnelli, 1979
- Oprohinus Reitter, 1916
- Oxyonyx Faust, 1885
- Paracoeliodes Colonnelli, 1979
- Parethelcus Wagner, 1943
- Paroxyonyx Hustache, 1931
- Perioxyonyx Hustache, 1931
- Petrocladus Korotyaev, 1997
- Phoeniconyx Korotyaev, 1997
- Phrydiuchus Gozis & M.des., 1885
- Platygasteronyx Reitter, 1913
- Platypteronyx Korotyaev, 1982
- Poophagus Schoenherr, 1837
- Prisistus Reitter, 1916
- Pseudocoeliodes Hoffmann, 1957
- Pseudoxyonyx Hoffmann, 1957
- Ranunculiphilus Dieckmann, 1970
- Rileyonymus Dietz, 1896
- Scythocladus Korotyaev, 1997
- Sinocolus Korotyaev, 1996
- Sirocalodes Voss, 1958
- Stenocarus Thomson, 1859
- Suboxyonyx Hoffmann, 1957
- Tapeinotus Schoenherr, 1826
- Tatyania Korotyaev, 1987
- Thamiocolus Thomson, 1859
- Theodorinus Korotyaev, 1982
- Tibetiellus Korotyaev, 1980
- Trachelanthus Korotyaev, 1980
- Trichocoeliodes Colonnelli, 1979
- Trichosirocalus Colonnelli, 1979
- Wagnerinus Korotyaev, 1980
- Zacladus Reitter, 1913
