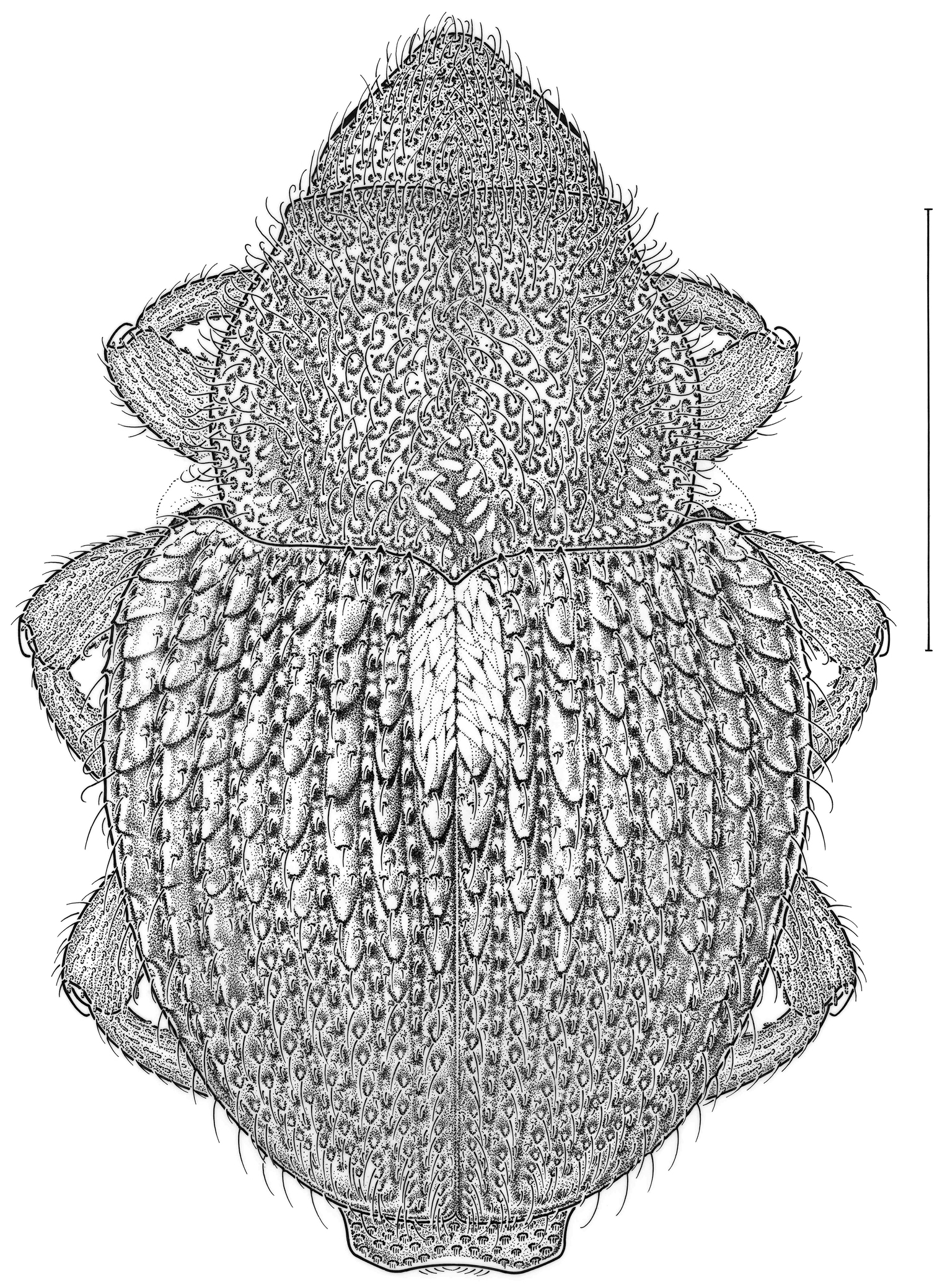
- Asperosoma echinatum

Scientific classification
- Kingdom: Animalia
- Phylum: Arthropoda
- Clade: Pancrustacea
- Class: Insecta
- Order: Coleoptera
- Suborder: Polyphaga
- Infraorder: Cucujiformia
- Family: Curculionidae
- Subfamily: Ceutorhynchinae
- Tribe: Scleropterini

= Scleropterini =

Tribe of beetles

Scleropterini is a tribe of minute seed weevils in the family of beetles known as Curculionidae. There are at least eight genera in Scleropterini.

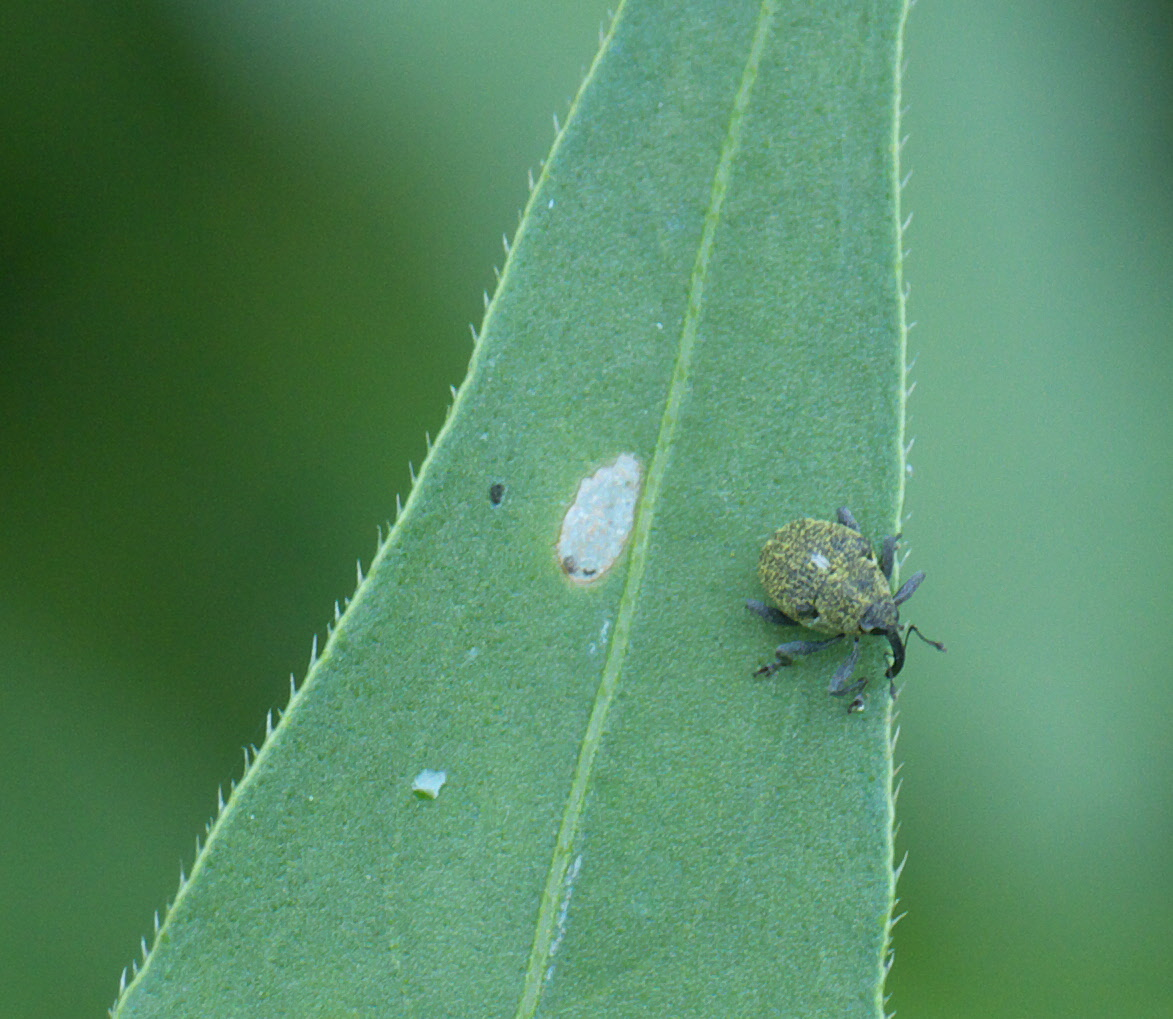
Homorosoma sulcipenne

== Genera ==
These eight genera belong to the tribe Scleropterini:

- Acallodes LeConte, 1876^{i c g b}
- Asperosoma Korotyaev, 1999^{g b}
- Homorosoma Frivaldszky, 1894^{i c g b}
- Prorutidosoma Korotyaev, 1999^{g b}
- Scleropteridius Otto, 1897^{c g}
- Scleropteroides Colonnelli, 1979^{c g}
- Scleropterus Schoenherr, 1825^{c g}
- Tapinotus Schoenherr, 1826^{c g}

Data sources: i = ITIS, c = Catalogue of Life, g = GBIF, b = Bugguide.net
