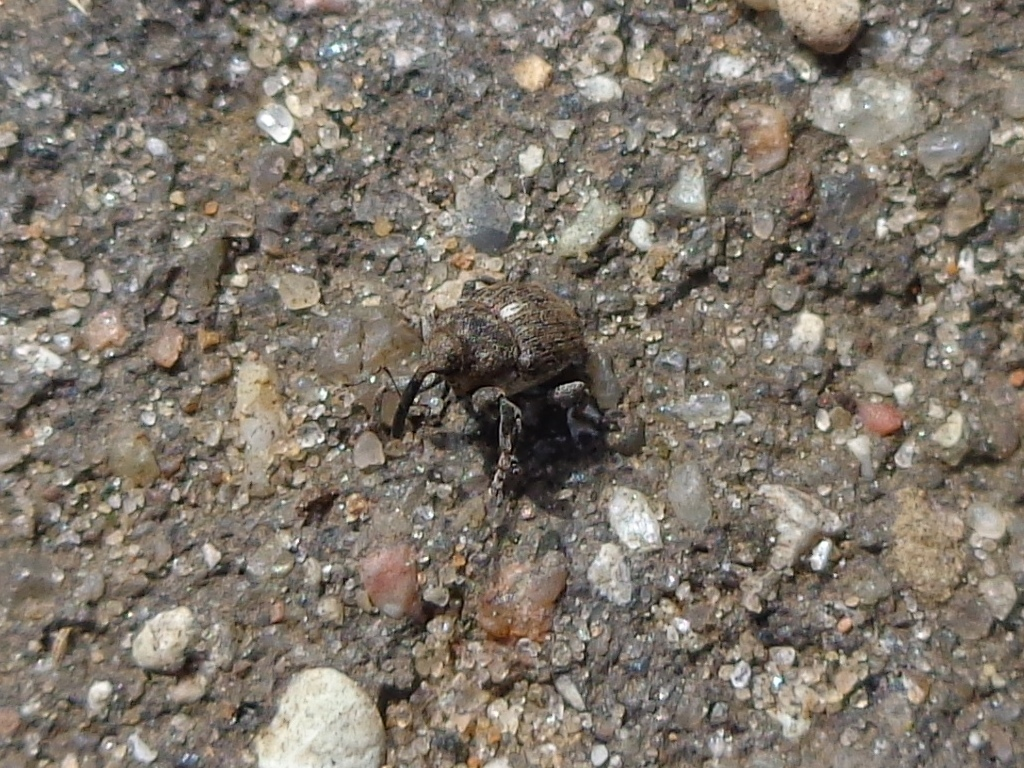
- Glocianus punctiger

Scientific classification
- Domain: Eukaryota
- Kingdom: Animalia
- Phylum: Arthropoda
- Class: Insecta
- Order: Coleoptera
- Suborder: Polyphaga
- Infraorder: Cucujiformia
- Family: Curculionidae
- Subfamily: Ceutorhynchinae
- Tribe: Ceutorhynchini
- Genus: Glocianus
- Species: G. punctiger

Binomial name
- Glocianus punctiger (Sahlberg, 1835)

= Glocianus punctiger =

Species of beetle

Glocianus punctiger is a species of weevil native to Europe.
