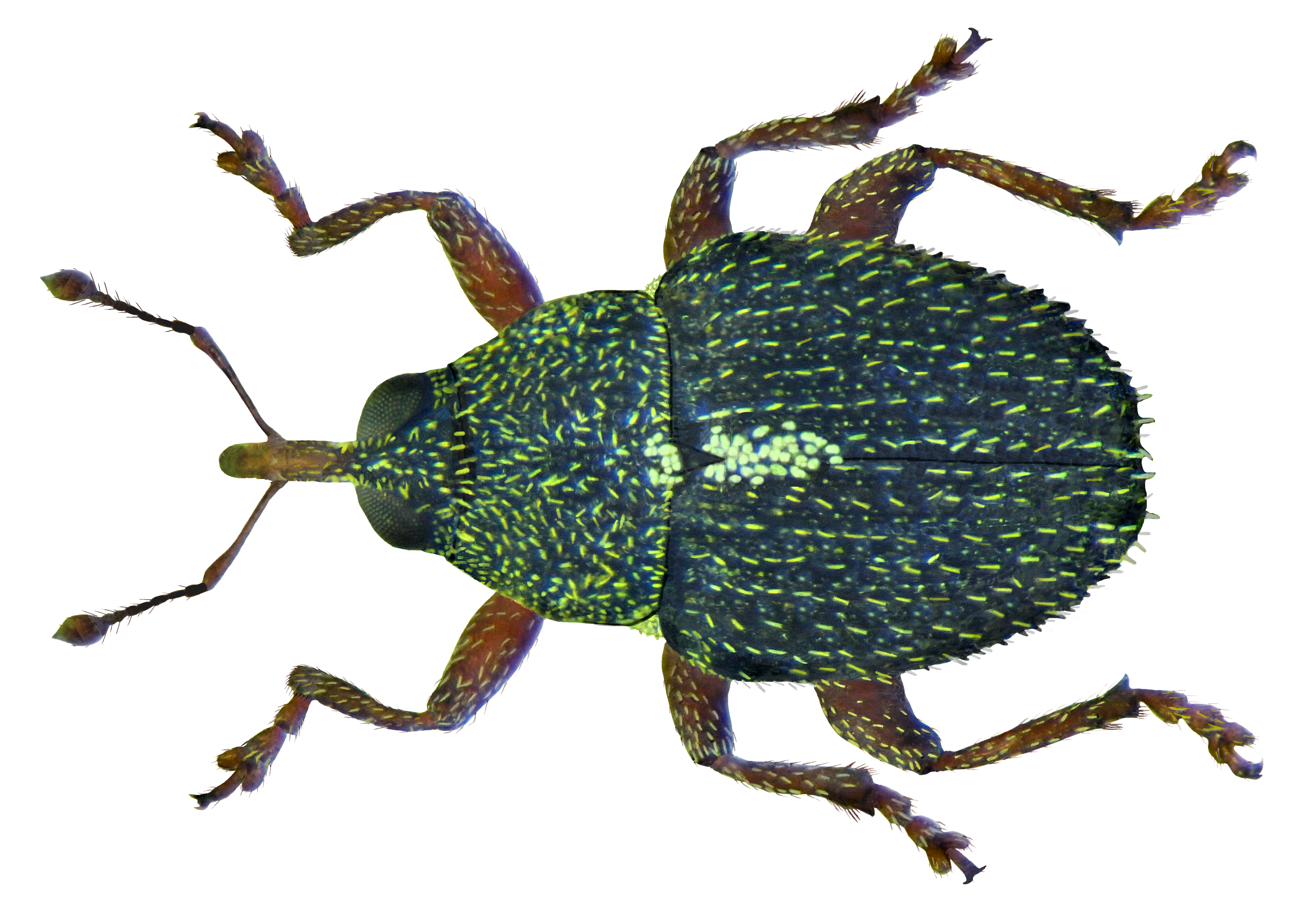
- Micrelus ericae 1,9 mm (1,6-2,3 mm)

Scientific classification
- Kingdom: Animalia
- Phylum: Arthropoda
- Class: Insecta
- Order: Coleoptera
- Suborder: Polyphaga
- Infraorder: Cucujiformia
- Family: Curculionidae
- Subfamily: Ceutorhynchinae
- Tribe: Ceutorhynchini
- Genus: Micrelus
- Species: M. ericae

Binomial name
- Micrelus ericae ( Gyllenhal, 1813)

= Micrelus ericae =

Species of beetle

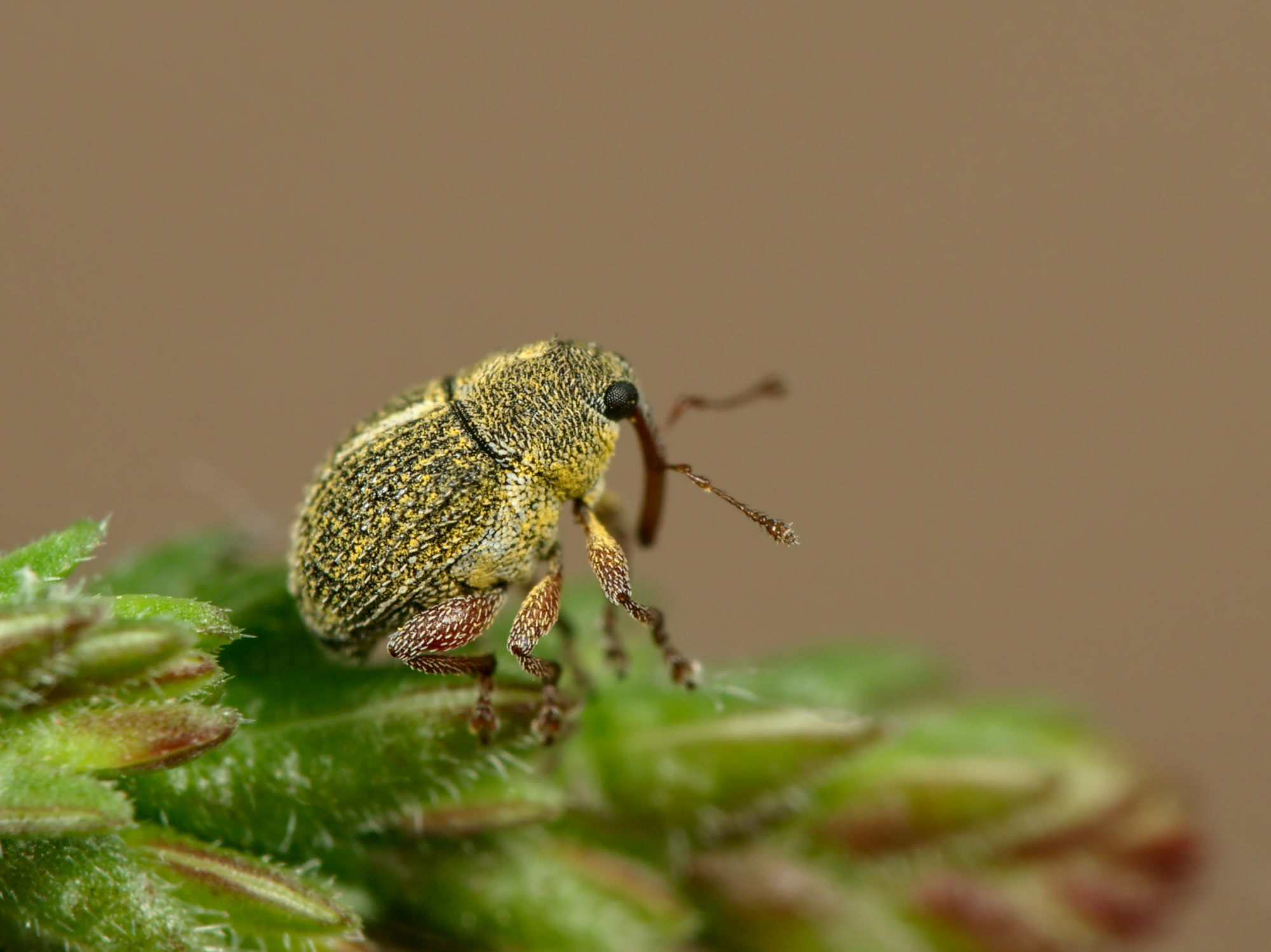
Micrelus ericae, Belgium

Micrelus ericae is a species of weevil native to Europe.
