= Hainokisaruzo =

Scientific classification
- Domain: Eukaryota
- Kingdom: Animalia
- Phylum: Arthropoda
- Class: Insecta
- Order: Coleoptera
- Suborder: Polyphaga
- Infraorder: Cucujiformia
- Family: Curculionidae
- Subfamily: Ceutorhynchinae
- Tribe: Ceutorhynchini
- Genus: Hainokisaruzo; Yoshitake & Colonnelli, 2005

Type species
- Hainokisaruzo japonicus Yoshitake & Colonnelli, 2005

Genus of beetles

Hainokisaruzo is a genus of Asian weevils, established in 2005 by Hiraku Yoshitake and Enzo Colonnelli. It includes several species formerly classified as Ceutorhynchoides spp. Several further species remain to be described.

The name Hainokisaruzo is a combination of the Japanese terms hai no ki, the name of the Symplocaceae trees they are associated with, and saruzo, the name for Ceutorhynchinae weevils.

== Species ==
[List incomplete]

- H. bengalensis (Colonnelli, 1984)
- H. fulvus Huang, Yoshitake & Zhang, 2008
- H. infuscatus Yoshitake & Colonnelli, 2005
- H. japonicus Yoshitake & Colonnelli, 2005
- H. nipponensis (Hustache, 1916)
- H. notatus (Colonnelli, 1984)
- H. sinensis (Korotyaev, 1989)
- H. subcostulatus (Hustache, 1920)
- H. topali (Colonnelli, 1984)
- H. wuyishanensis Huang, Yoshitake & Zhang, 2008
