= Parethelcus =

Scientific classification
- Domain: Eukaryota
- Kingdom: Animalia
- Phylum: Arthropoda
- Class: Insecta
- Order: Coleoptera
- Suborder: Polyphaga
- Infraorder: Cucujiformia
- Family: Curculionidae
- Subfamily: Ceutorhynchinae
- Tribe: Ceutorhynchini
- Genus: Parethelcus; Dieckmann, 1972

Genus of beetles

Parethelcus is a genus of beetles belonging to the family Curculionidae.

The species of this genus are found in Europe.

Species:

- Parethelcus nesicola Colonnelli, 1991
- Parethelcus pollinarius (Forster, 1771)
