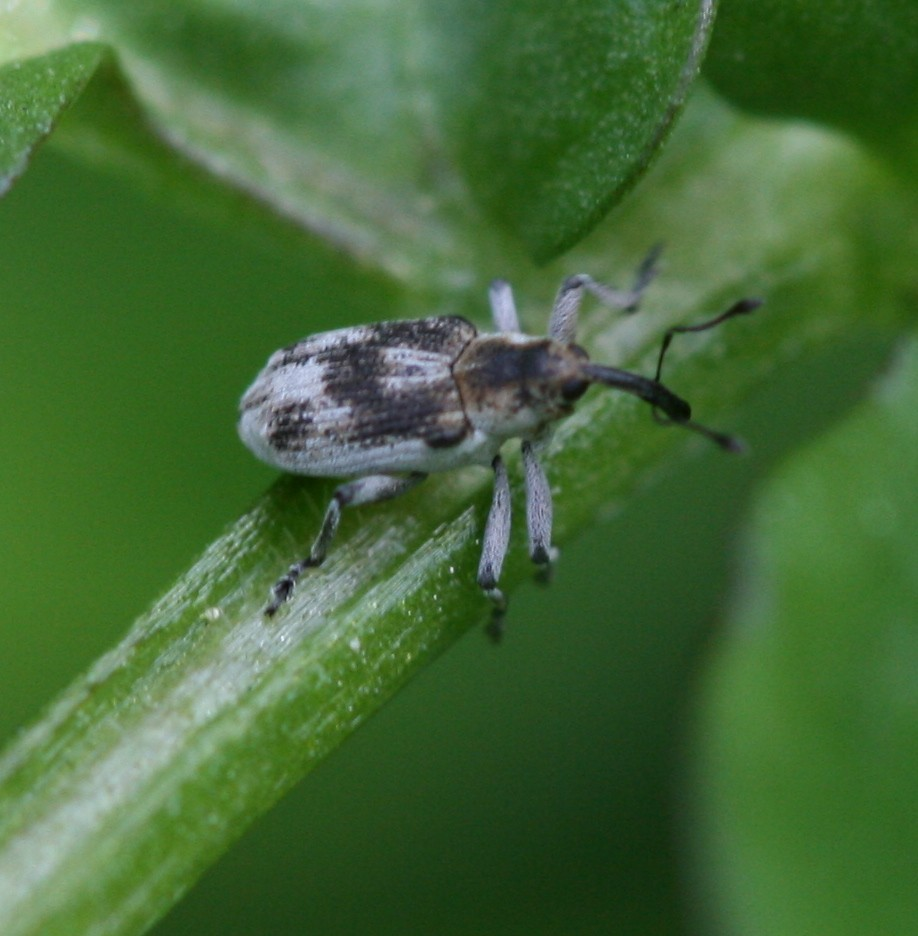
- Poophagus sisymbrii 3.0 mm (2.6-3.7 mm)

Scientific classification
- Kingdom: Animalia
- Phylum: Arthropoda
- Clade: Pancrustacea
- Class: Insecta
- Order: Coleoptera
- Suborder: Polyphaga
- Infraorder: Cucujiformia
- Superfamily: Curculionoidea
- Family: Curculionidae
- Genus: Poophagus
- Species: P. sisymbrii

Binomial name
- Poophagus sisymbrii (Fabricius, 1777)

= Poophagus sisymbrii =

Species of beetle

Poophagus sisymbrii is a species of weevil native to Europe. Nasturtium officinale is the usual host plant.
