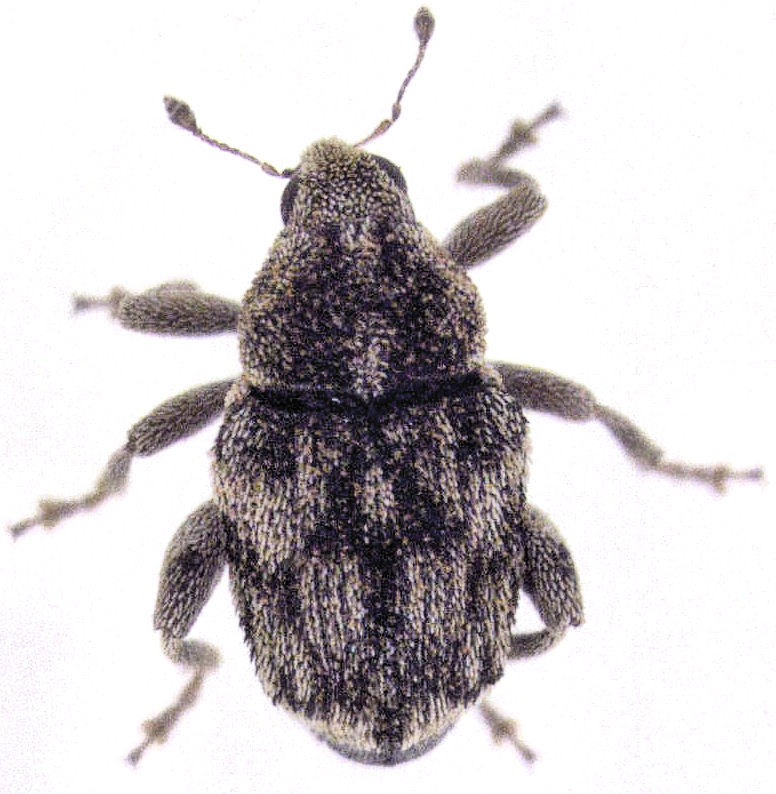
- Hypurus bertrandi

Scientific classification
- Kingdom: Animalia
- Phylum: Arthropoda
- Clade: Pancrustacea
- Class: Insecta
- Order: Coleoptera
- Suborder: Polyphaga
- Infraorder: Cucujiformia
- Family: Curculionidae
- Subfamily: Ceutorhynchinae
- Genus: Hypurus; Rey, 1882

= Hypurus =

Genus of beetles

Hypurus is a genus of minute seed weevils in the beetle family Curculionidae. There is at least one described species in Hypurus, H. bertrandi.
