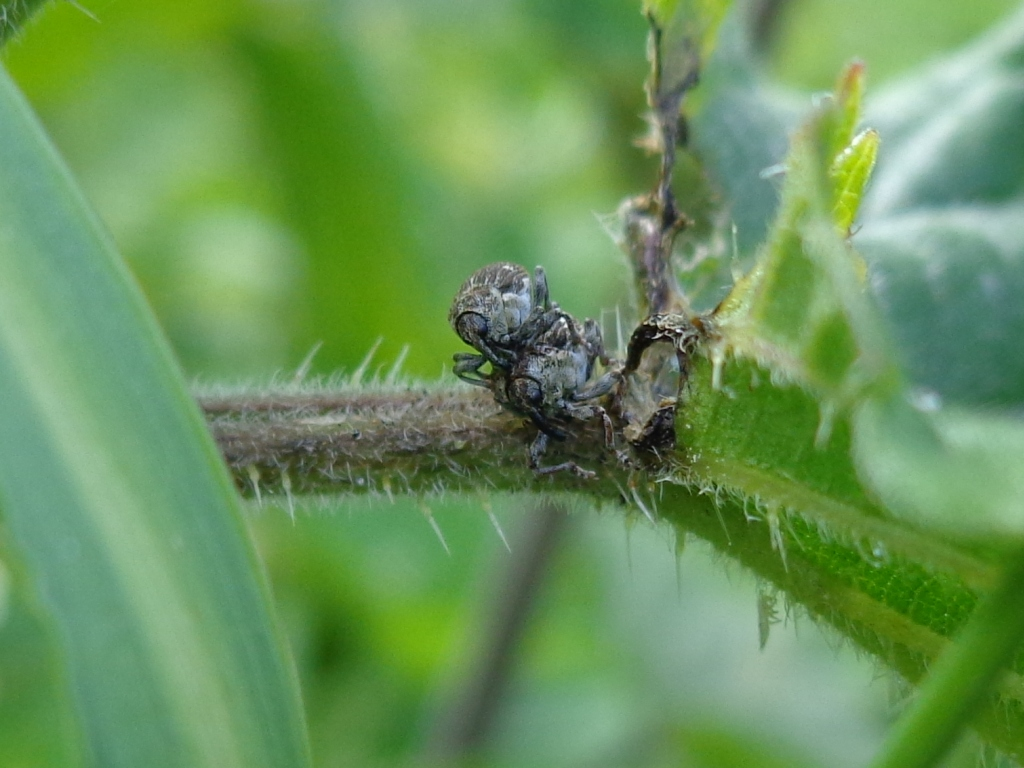
- Coeliastes lamii

Scientific classification
- Domain: Eukaryota
- Kingdom: Animalia
- Phylum: Arthropoda
- Class: Insecta
- Order: Coleoptera
- Suborder: Polyphaga
- Infraorder: Cucujiformia
- Family: Curculionidae
- Subfamily: Ceutorhynchinae
- Tribe: Ceutorhynchini
- Genus: Coeliastes; Weiser, 1883

= Coeliastes =

Genus of beetles

Coeliastes is a genus of beetles belonging to the family Curculionidae.

The genus was first described by Weise in 1883.

The species of this genus are found in Europe.

Species:

- Coeliastes lamii (Fabricius, 1792)
