= Amalorrhynchus =

Scientific classification
- Kingdom: Animalia
- Phylum: Arthropoda
- Class: Insecta
- Order: Coleoptera
- Suborder: Polyphaga
- Infraorder: Cucujiformia
- Family: Curculionidae
- Subfamily: Ceutorhynchinae
- Tribe: Ceutorhynchini
- Genus: Amalorrhynchus; Reitter, 1913

Genus of beetles

Amalorrhynchus is a genus of beetles belonging to the family Curculionidae.

The genus was first described by Edmund Reitter in 1913.

== Species ==
There are two species recognised in the genus Amalorrhynchus:

- Amalorrhynchus lukjanovitshi Korotyaev, 1980
- Amalorrhynchus melanarius (Stephens, 1831)
