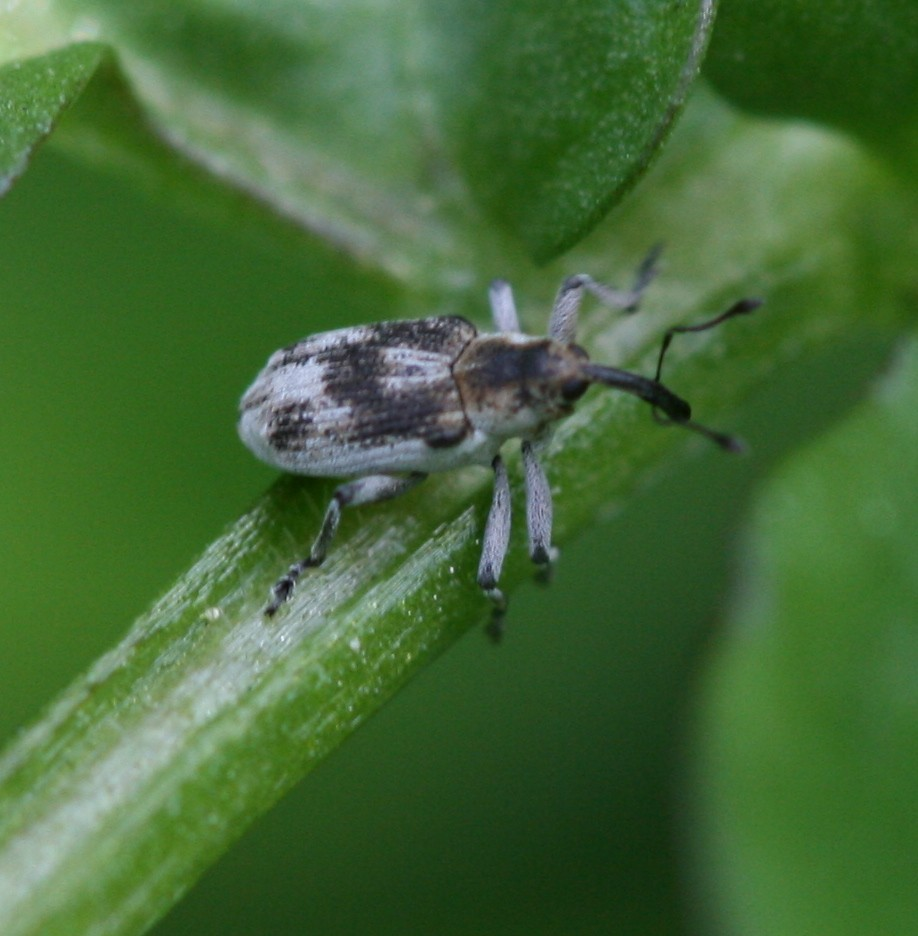
- Poophagus sisymbrii

Scientific classification
- Domain: Eukaryota
- Kingdom: Animalia
- Phylum: Arthropoda
- Class: Insecta
- Order: Coleoptera
- Suborder: Polyphaga
- Infraorder: Cucujiformia
- Family: Curculionidae
- Subfamily: Ceutorhynchinae
- Tribe: Ceutorhynchini
- Genus: Poophagus; Schönherr, 1837

= Poophagus =

Genus of beetles

Poophagus is a genus of beetle belonging to the family Curculionidae.

The species of this genus are found in Europe and North America.

Species:

- Poophagus araneipes Faust, 1882
- Poophagus hopffgarteni Tourn., 1872-1876
- Poophagus sisymbrii (Fabricius, 1777)
