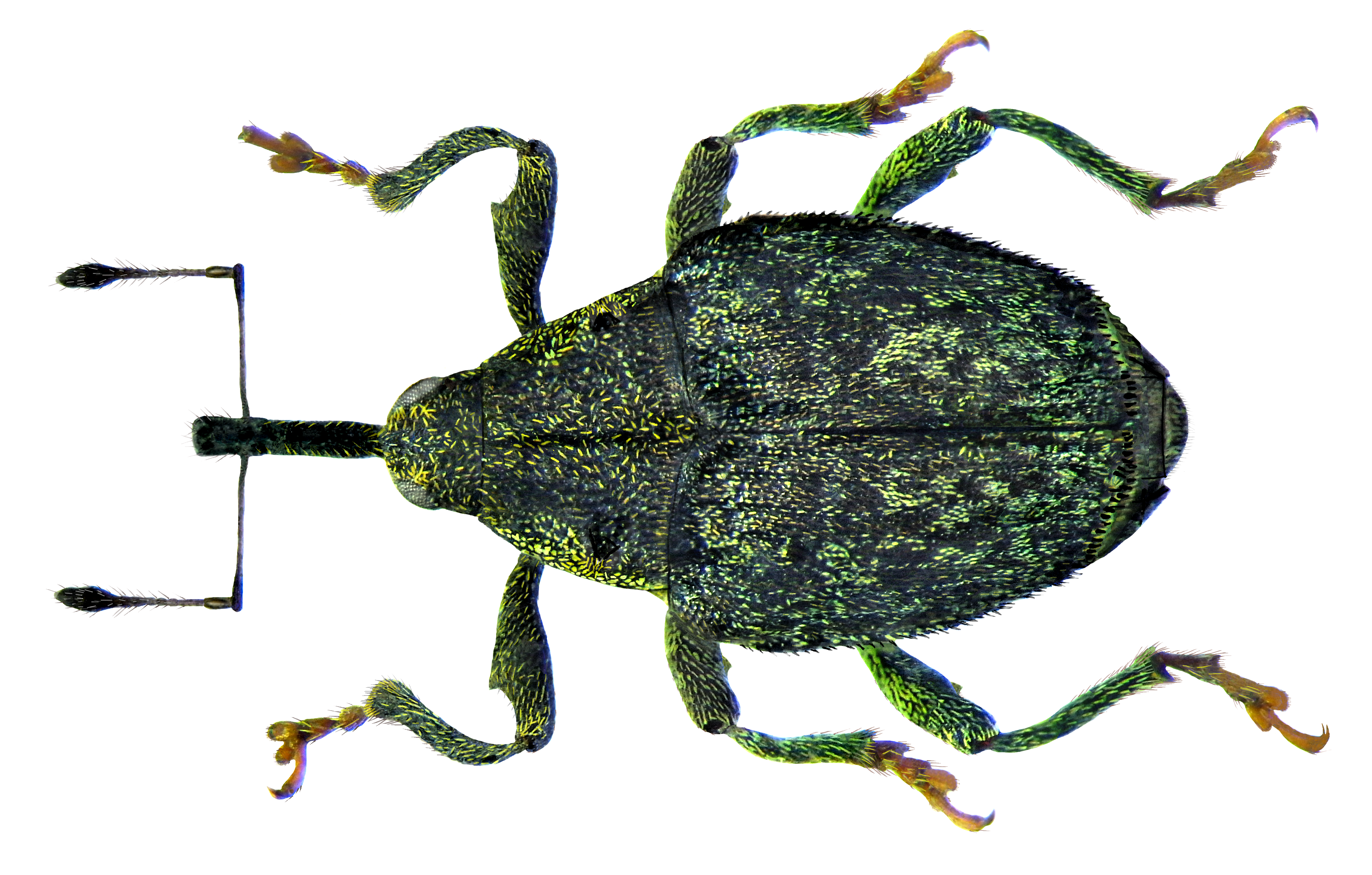

Scientific classification
- Kingdom: Animalia
- Phylum: Arthropoda
- Class: Insecta
- Order: Coleoptera
- Suborder: Polyphaga
- Infraorder: Cucujiformia
- Family: Curculionidae
- Genus: Parethelcus
- Species: P. pollinarius

Binomial name
- Parethelcus pollinarius (Forster, 1771)

= Parethelcus pollinarius =

Species of beetle

Parethelcus pollinarius is a species of weevil native to Europe.
