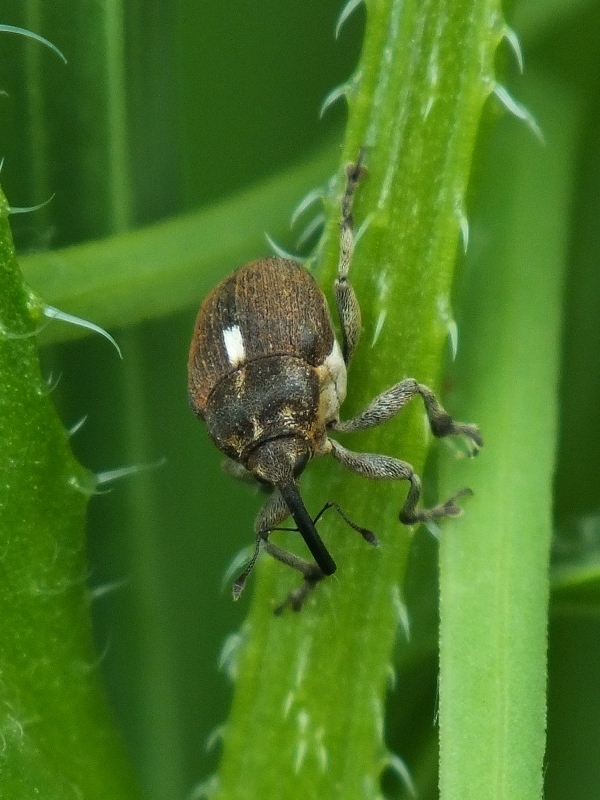
- Glocianus herbsti, Russia

Scientific classification
- Kingdom: Animalia
- Phylum: Arthropoda
- Class: Insecta
- Order: Coleoptera
- Suborder: Polyphaga
- Infraorder: Cucujiformia
- Family: Curculionidae
- Subfamily: Ceutorhynchinae
- Tribe: Ceutorhynchini
- Genus: Glocianus; Reitter, 1916

Synonyms
- Prenesdus Reitter, 1916

= Glocianus =

Genus of beetles

Glocianus is a genus of minute seed weevils in the beetle family Curculionidae. There are about 15 described species in Glocianus.

== Species ==
These 15 species belong to the genus Glocianus:

- Glocianus albovittatus (Germar, E.F., 1823)
- Glocianus bituberculatus Colonnelli, 1998
- Glocianus distinctus (Ch.Brisout de Barneville, 1870)
- Glocianus fennicus (Faust, 1895)
- Glocianus herbsti (Faust, 1895)
- Glocianus lethierryi (C.Brisout, 1866)
- Glocianus maculaalba (Herbst, J.F.W., 1795)
- Glocianus nebulosus (C.Brisout, 1866)
- Glocianus pilosellus (Gyllenhal, 1837)
- Glocianus punctiger (Gyllenhal, 1837)
- Glocianus ragusae (C.Brisout, 1884)
- Glocianus rudissimus Colonnelli, 1998
- Glocianus rufimanus (C.Brisout, 1883)
- Glocianus superstes Colonnelli, 1997
- Glocianus tshistyakovae Colonnelli, 2004
