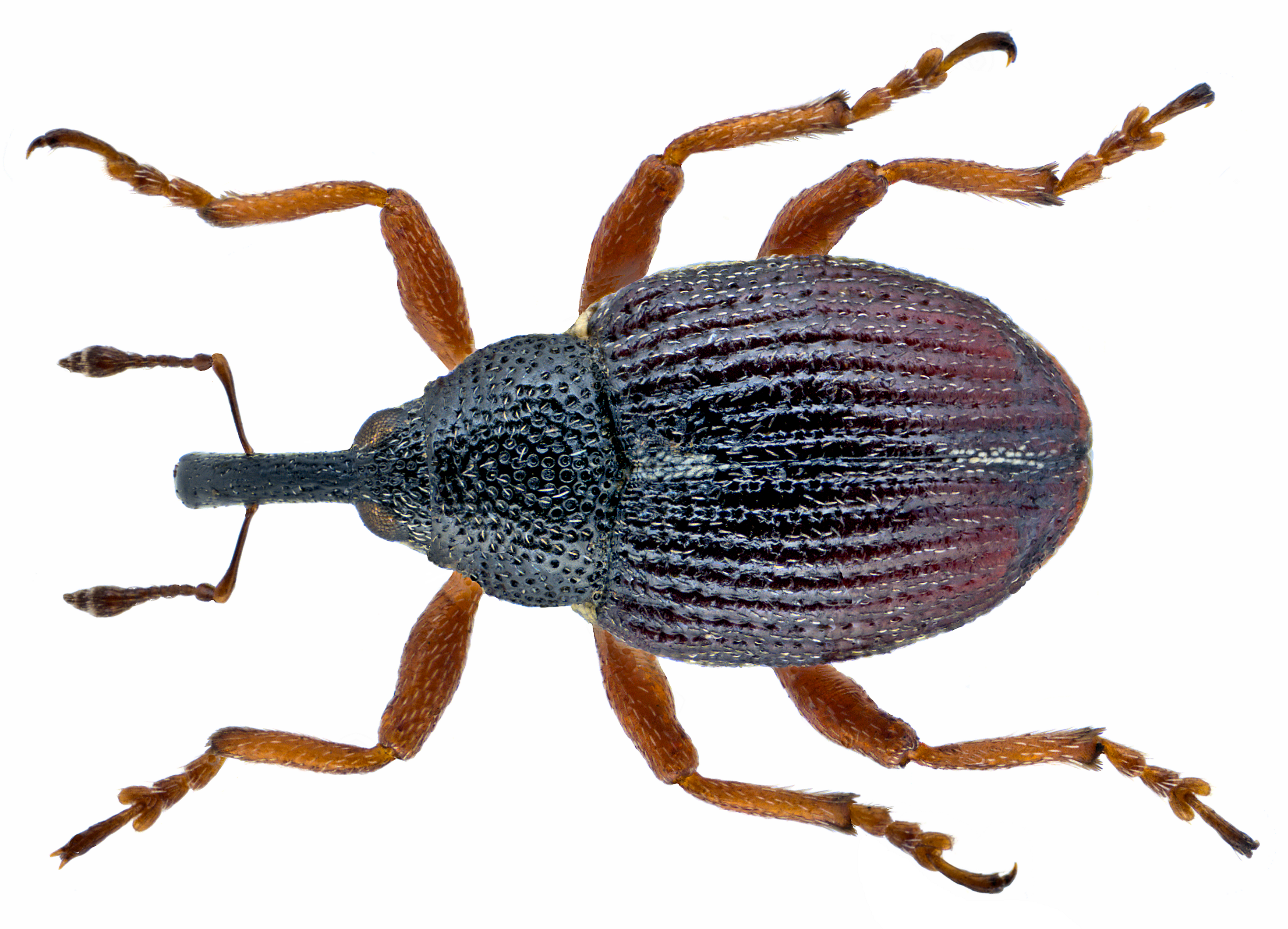

Scientific classification
- Domain: Eukaryota
- Kingdom: Animalia
- Phylum: Arthropoda
- Class: Insecta
- Order: Coleoptera
- Suborder: Polyphaga
- Infraorder: Cucujiformia
- Family: Curculionidae
- Genus: Amalus
- Species: A. scortillum

Binomial name
- Amalus scortillum Schoenherr, 1825

= Amalus scortillum =

Species of weevil beetle

Amalus scortillum is a species of minute seed weevil in the family Curculionidae.

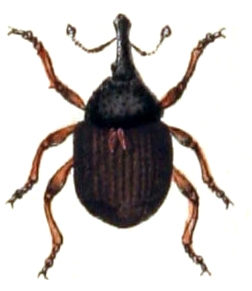
