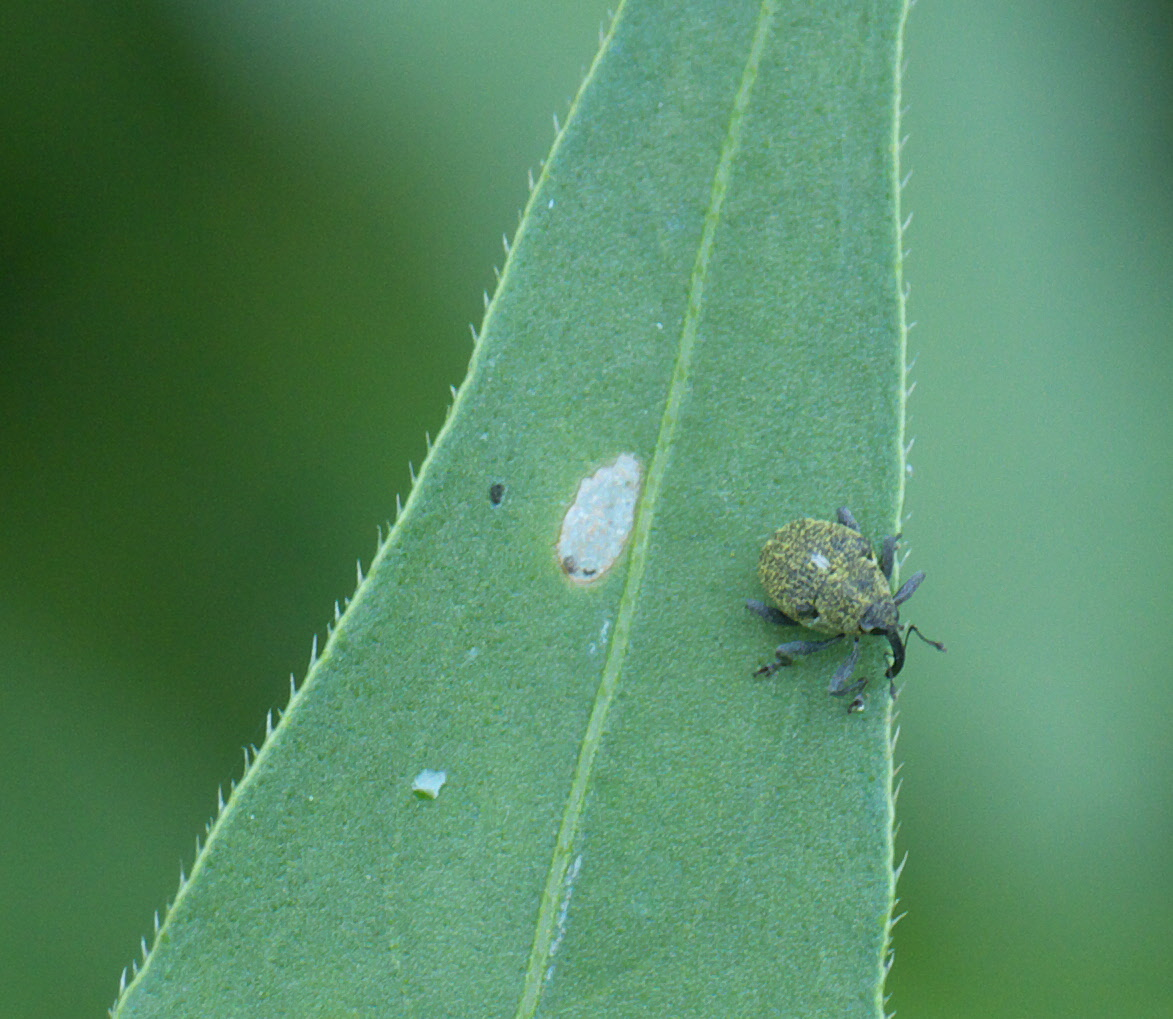

Scientific classification
- Kingdom: Animalia
- Phylum: Arthropoda
- Class: Insecta
- Order: Coleoptera
- Suborder: Polyphaga
- Infraorder: Cucujiformia
- Family: Curculionidae
- Genus: Homorosoma
- Species: H. sulcipenne

Binomial name
- Homorosoma sulcipenne (LeConte, 1876)

= Homorosoma sulcipenne =

Species of beetle

Homorosoma sulcipenne is a species of minute seed weevil in the beetle family Curculionidae.
