= Acallodes saltoides =

Scientific classification
- Domain: Eukaryota
- Kingdom: Animalia
- Phylum: Arthropoda
- Class: Insecta
- Order: Coleoptera
- Suborder: Polyphaga
- Infraorder: Cucujiformia
- Family: Curculionidae
- Genus: Acallodes
- Species: A. saltoides

Binomial name
- Acallodes saltoides Dietz, 1896

Species of weevil beetle

Acallodes saltoides is a species of minute seed weevil in the family of beetles known as Curculionidae. It is found in North America.
