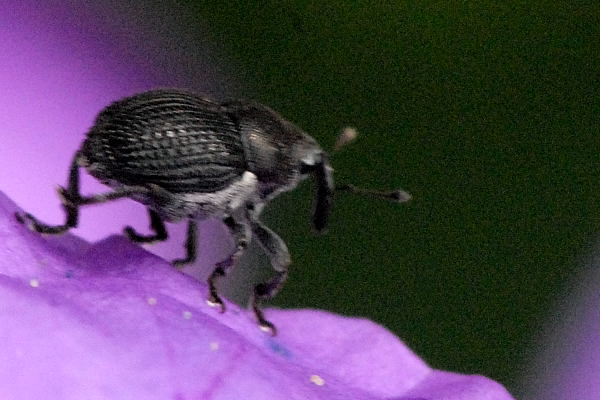
- Zacladus geranii, Meadow Cranesbill Weevil

Scientific classification
- Kingdom: Animalia
- Phylum: Arthropoda
- Class: Insecta
- Order: Coleoptera
- Suborder: Polyphaga
- Infraorder: Cucujiformia
- Family: Curculionidae
- Subfamily: Ceutorhynchinae
- Tribe: Ceutorhynchini
- Genus: Zacladus; Reitter, 1913

Synonyms
- Amurocladus Korotyaev, 1997; Angarocladus Korotyaev, 1997; Gobicladus Korotyaev, 1997; Petrocladus Korotyaev, 1997; Scythocladus Korotyaev, 1997

= Zacladus =

Genus of beetles

Zacladus is a genus of minute seed weevils in the beetle family Curculionidae. There are about 13 described species in Zacladus.

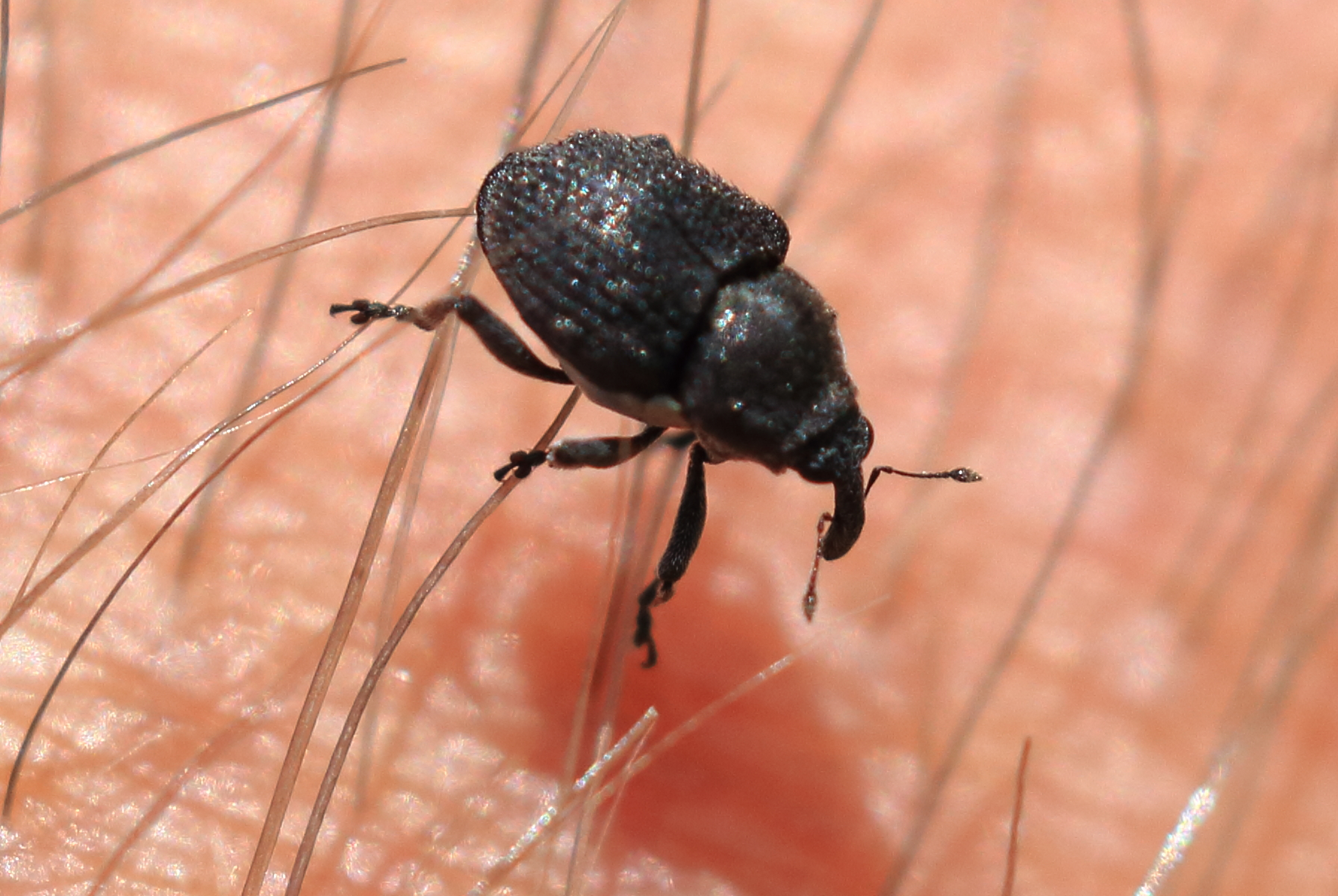
Zacladus geranii, Meadow Cranesbill Weevil

== Species ==
These 13 species belong to the genus Zacladus:

- Zacladus asperatus Gyll. in Schoenh., 1837
- Zacladus asperulus Faust, 1893
- Zacladus exiguus (Olivier, A.G., 1807) (Bloody Cranesbill Weevil)
- Zacladus foedus Korotyaev, 1980
- Zacladus geranii (Paykull, 1800) (Meadow Cranesbill Weevil)
- Zacladus macrasper Reitt., 1901
- Zacladus radula Hochh., 1851
- Zacladus simplicicollis Reitt., 1901
- Zacladus stierlini Schultze, 1902
- Zacladus subopacithorax Pic, 1916
- Zacladus thomsoni Schultze, 1901
- Zacladus transversicollis Faust, 1894
- Zacladus turkestanicus Hustache, 1930
