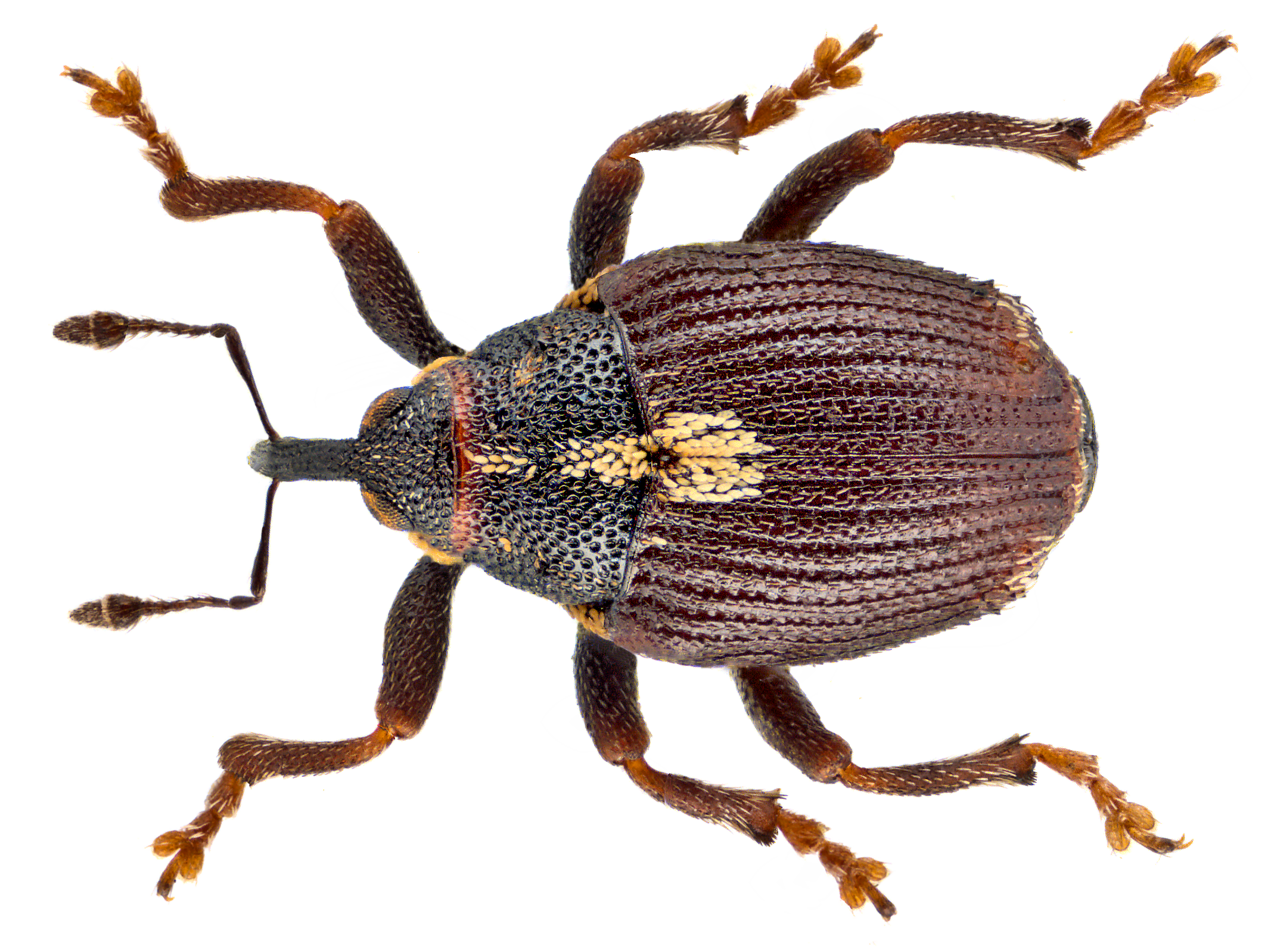
- Calosirus terminatus 2,3 mm (1,8-2,5 mm)

Scientific classification
- Kingdom: Animalia
- Phylum: Arthropoda
- Class: Insecta
- Order: Coleoptera
- Suborder: Polyphaga
- Infraorder: Cucujiformia
- Family: Curculionidae
- Genus: Calosirus
- Species: C. terminatus

Binomial name
- Calosirus terminatus (Herbst, 1795)

= Calosirus terminatus =

Species of beetle

Calosirus terminatus is a species of weevil native to Europe.
