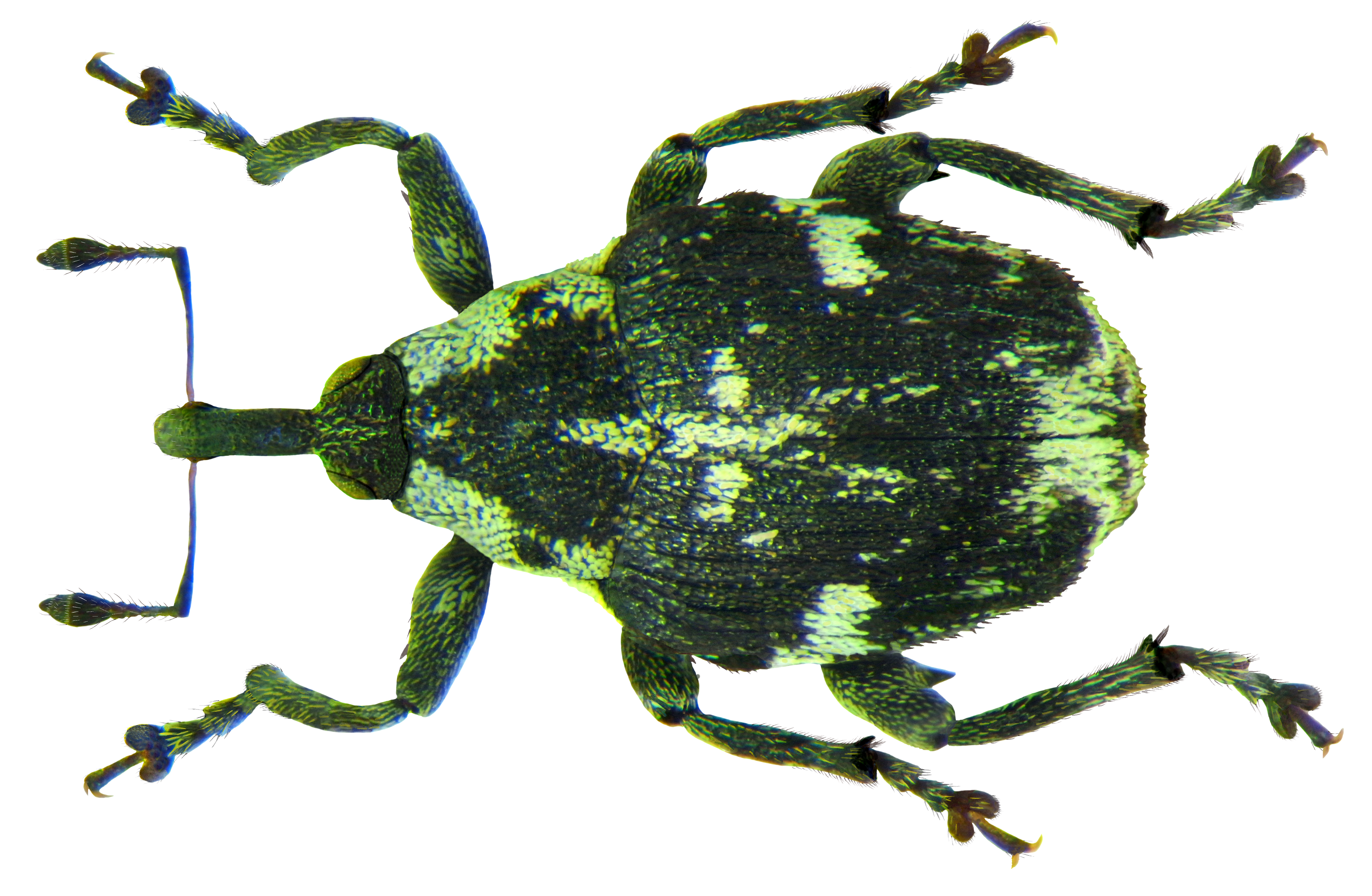

Scientific classification
- Domain: Eukaryota
- Kingdom: Animalia
- Phylum: Arthropoda
- Class: Insecta
- Order: Coleoptera
- Suborder: Polyphaga
- Infraorder: Cucujiformia
- Family: Curculionidae
- Genus: Hadroplontus
- Species: H. litura

Binomial name
- Hadroplontus litura (Fabricius, 1775)

= Hadroplontus litura =

Species of beetle

Hadroplontus litura, the Canada thistle stem weevil, is a species of minute seed weevil in the family of beetles known as Curculionidae.
