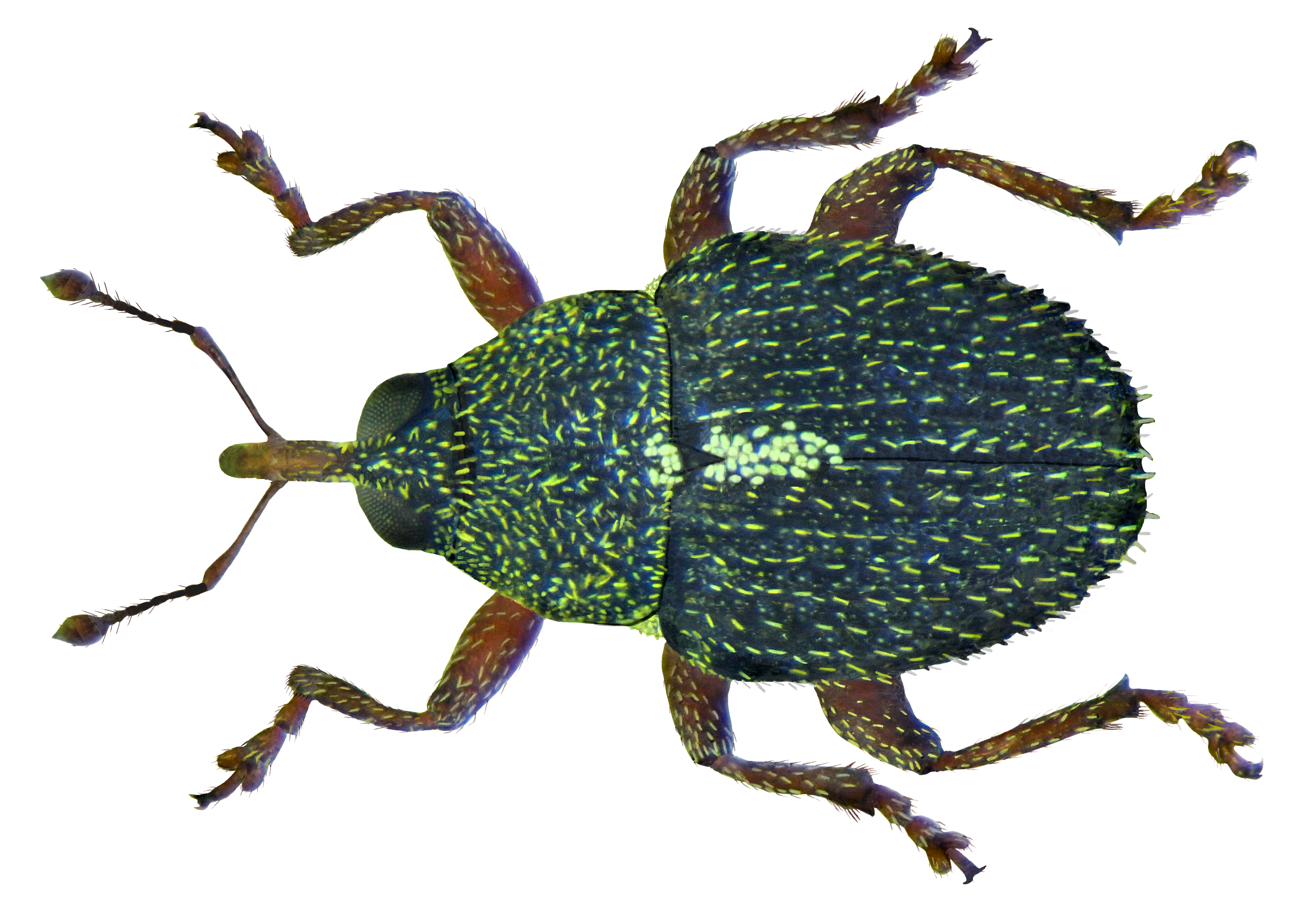
- Micrelus ericae

Scientific classification
- Kingdom: Animalia
- Phylum: Arthropoda
- Class: Insecta
- Order: Coleoptera
- Suborder: Polyphaga
- Infraorder: Cucujiformia
- Family: Curculionidae
- Subfamily: Ceutorhynchinae
- Tribe: Ceutorhynchini
- Genus: Micrelus; Thomson, 1859

= Micrelus =

Genus of beetles

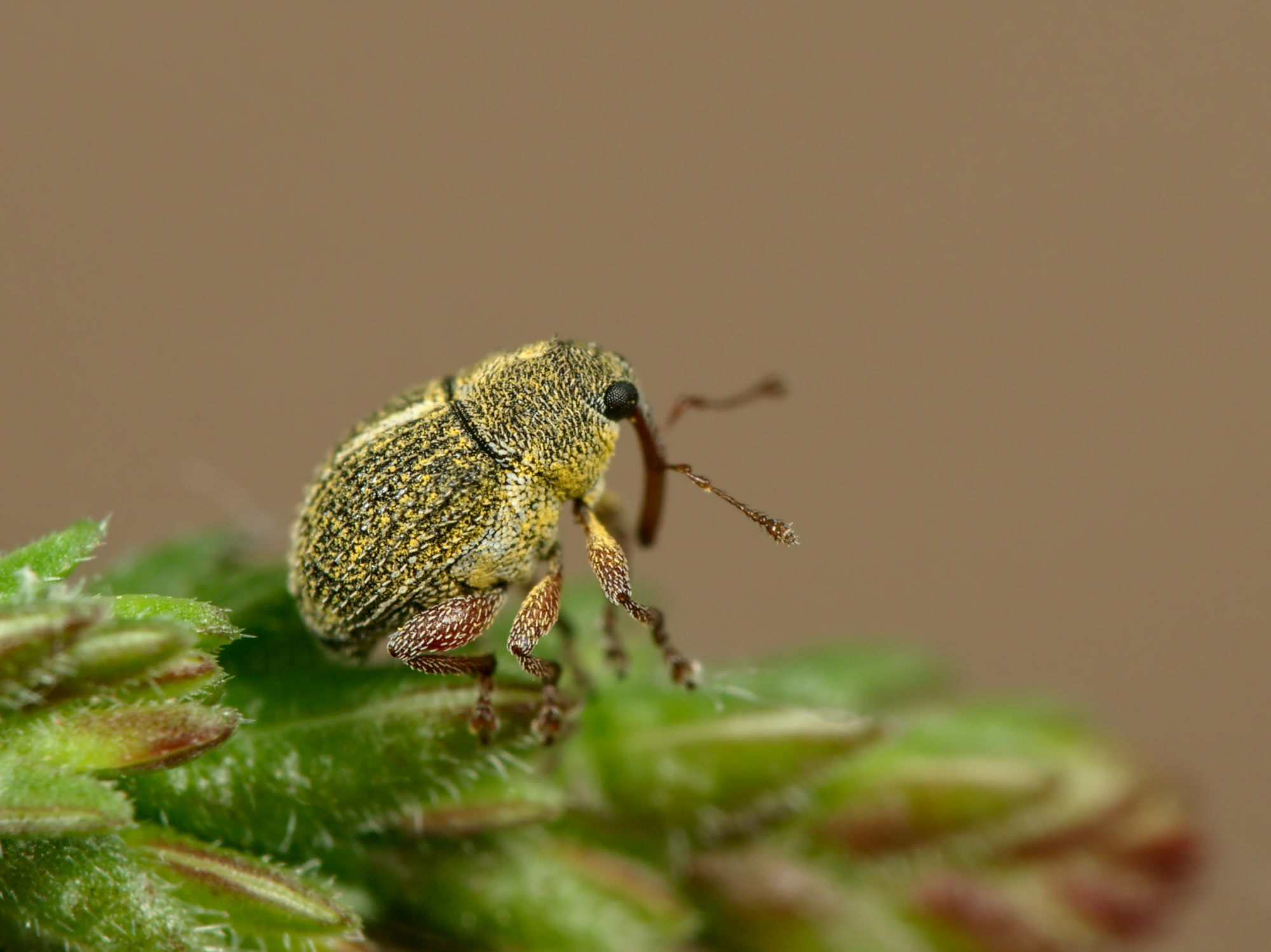
Micrelus ericae, Belgium

Micrelus is a genus of beetles belonging to the family Curculionidae.

The species of this genus are found in Europe, Africa, Japan.

== Species ==
These 20 species belong to the genus Micrelus:

- Micrelus alluaudi Hustache, 1916
- Micrelus arabicus Colonnelli, 1984
- Micrelus bipustulatus Schultze, 1899
- Micrelus bisquamosus Hustache, 1916
- Micrelus cruciatus Schultze, 1899
- Micrelus cruentatus Hustache, 1939
- Micrelus ericae (Gyllenhal, 1813)
- Micrelus excavatus Hustache, 1916
- Micrelus gyllenhali Hoffmann, 1955
- Micrelus humilis Hustache, 1930
- Micrelus jeanneli Hustache, 1916
- Micrelus minutissimus Hustache, 1916
- Micrelus polliger Osella, Colonnelli & Zuppa, 1998
- Micrelus rhusii Osella, Colonnelli & Zuppa, 1998
- Micrelus rinicae Osella, Colonnelli & Zuppa, 1998
- Micrelus rufescens Schultze, 1898
- Micrelus saetiger Colonnelli, 1984
- Micrelus schimperi Colonnelli, 1984
- Micrelus szunyoghyi Colonnelli, 1984
- Micrelus usambaricus Schultze, 1899
