= Calosirus =

Scientific classification
- Domain: Eukaryota
- Kingdom: Animalia
- Phylum: Arthropoda
- Class: Insecta
- Order: Coleoptera
- Suborder: Polyphaga
- Infraorder: Cucujiformia
- Family: Curculionidae
- Subfamily: Ceutorhynchinae
- Tribe: Ceutorhynchini
- Genus: Calosirus; Thomson, 1859

Genus of beetles

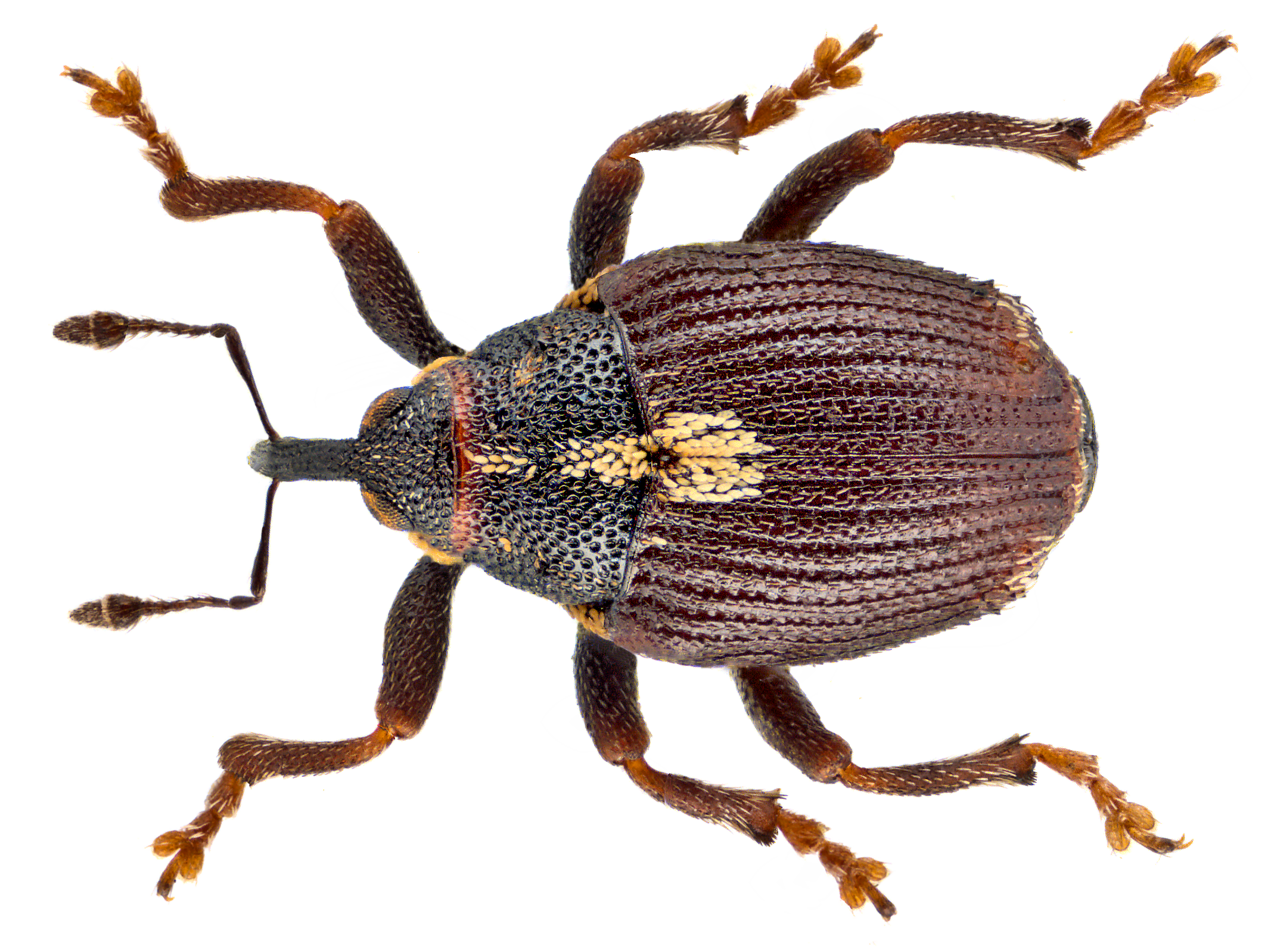
Calosirus terminatus

Calosirus is a genus of beetles belonging to the family Curculionidae.

The genus was first described by Thomson in 1859.

The species of this genus are found in Europe.

Species:

- Calosirus apicalis
- Calosirus terminatus
