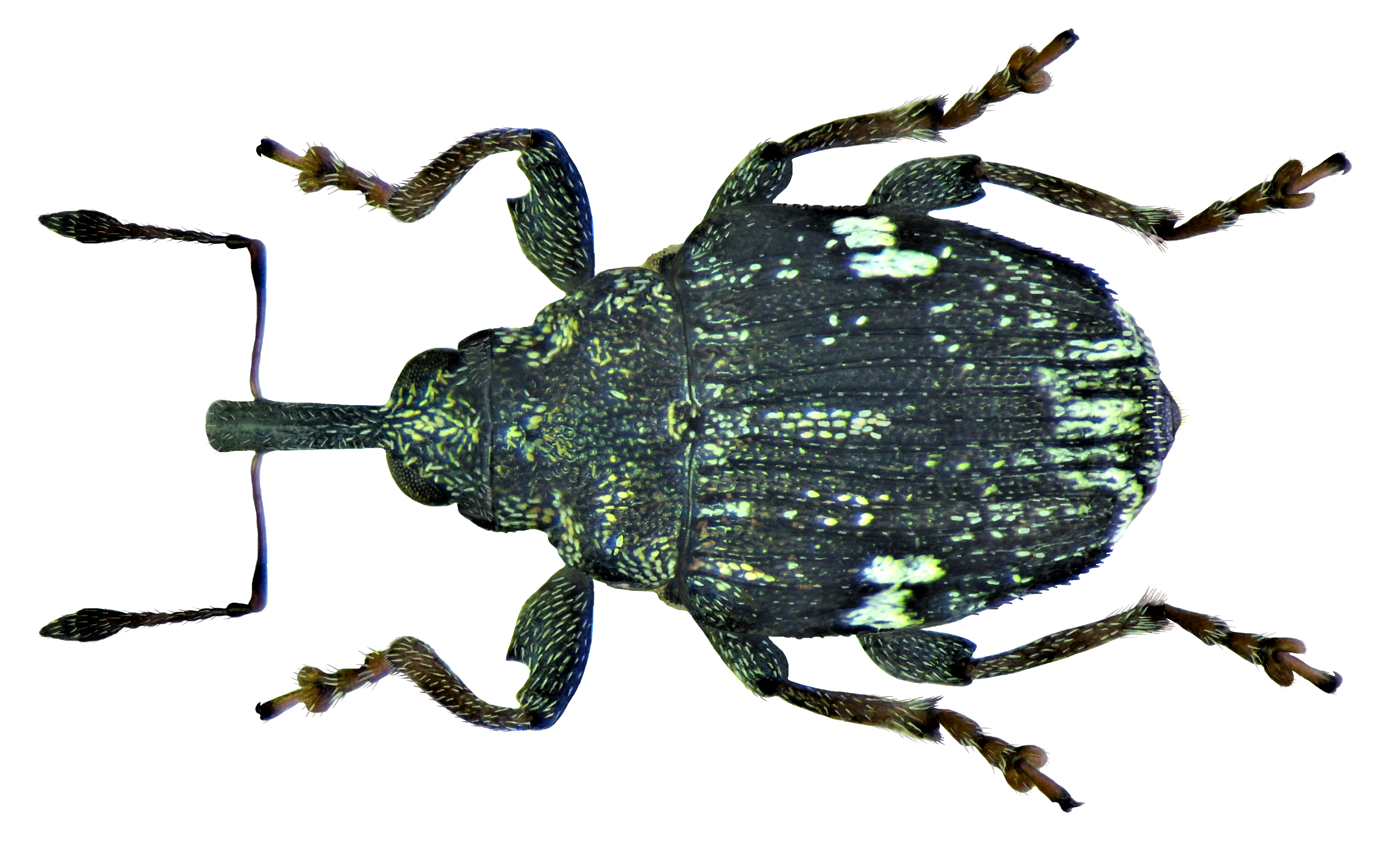

Scientific classification
- Kingdom: Animalia
- Phylum: Arthropoda
- Class: Insecta
- Order: Coleoptera
- Suborder: Polyphaga
- Infraorder: Cucujiformia
- Family: Curculionidae
- Tribe: Ceutorhynchini
- Genus: Mogulones; Reitter, 1916

= Mogulones =

Genus of beetles

Mogulones is a genus of minute seed weevils in the family of beetles known as Curculionidae. There are at least 30 described species in Mogulones.

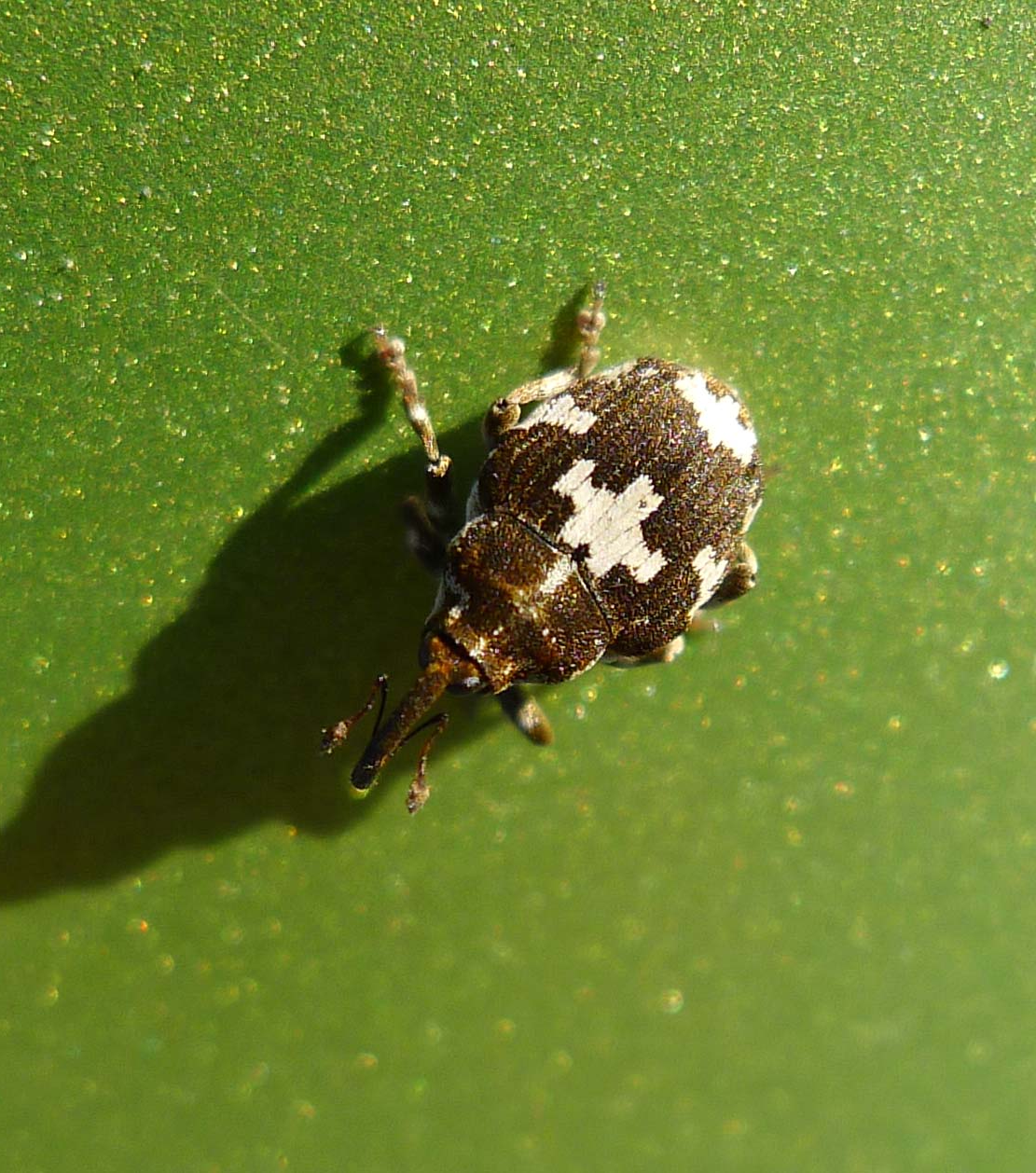

== Species ==
These 37 species belong to the genus Mogulones:

- Mogulones abbreviatulus (Fabricius, J.C., 1792)^{c g}
- Mogulones annibal (Desbrochers, 1896)^{g}
- Mogulones arcasi (C.Brisout de Barneville, 1869)^{g}
- Mogulones aubei (Boheman, 1845)^{g}
- Mogulones audisioi Colonnelli, 1987^{c}
- Mogulones austriacus (C.Brisout, 1869)^{g}
- Mogulones biondii Colonnelli, 1992^{c}
- Mogulones borraginis (Fabricius, J.C., 1792)^{c g}
- Mogulones crucifer (Pallas, 1771)^{c g b} (Hound's-tongue root weevil)
- Mogulones cynoglossi (Frauenfeld, 1866)^{g}
- Mogulones deiectus Colonnelli, 1992^{c}
- Mogulones diecki (H.Brisout, 1870)^{g}
- Mogulones dimidiatus (Frivaldszky, 1865)^{g}
- Mogulones geographicus (Goeze, J.A.E., 1777)^{c g}
- Mogulones gratiosus (C.Brisout de Barneville, 1869)^{g}
- Mogulones grisescens (Pic, 1940)^{g}
- Mogulones humicola Colonnelli, 2005^{c}
- Mogulones hungaricus (C.Brisout, 1869)^{g}
- Mogulones hyrcanus Korotyaev, 1992^{c}
- Mogulones javetii (Gerhardt, 1867)^{g}
- Mogulones koreanus Korotyaev, 1994^{c}
- Mogulones kwoni Korotyaev & Hong, 2004^{c}
- Mogulones lewisi Colonnelli, 1986^{c}
- Mogulones lobanovi Korotyaev, 1992^{c}
- Mogulones lodosianus Colonnelli, 1987^{c}
- Mogulones lopezi Colonnelli, 1986^{c}
- Mogulones pallidicornis (Gougelet & Brisout de Barneville, 1860)^{g}
- Mogulones pseudopollinarius Colonnelli, 1991^{c}
- Mogulones raphani (Fabricius, J.C., 1792)^{c g}
- Mogulones rheophilus Colonnelli, 2005^{c}
- Mogulones sahini Gültekin & Colonnelli, 2006^{c}
- Mogulones sainteclairei (H.Wagner, 1927)^{g}
- Mogulones soricinus (C.Brisout, 1869)^{g}
- Mogulones sublineellus (C.Brisout, 1869)^{g}
- Mogulones tatyanae Korotyaev, 1992^{c}
- Mogulones venedicus (Weise, 1879)^{g}
- Mogulones vittatipennis Colonnelli, 1986^{c}

Data sources: i = ITIS, c = Catalogue of Life, g = GBIF, b = Bugguide.net
