= Rutidosoma =

Scientific classification
- Domain: Eukaryota
- Kingdom: Animalia
- Phylum: Arthropoda
- Class: Insecta
- Order: Coleoptera
- Suborder: Polyphaga
- Infraorder: Cucujiformia
- Family: Curculionidae
- Genus: Rutidosoma; Stephens, 1831

Genus of beetles

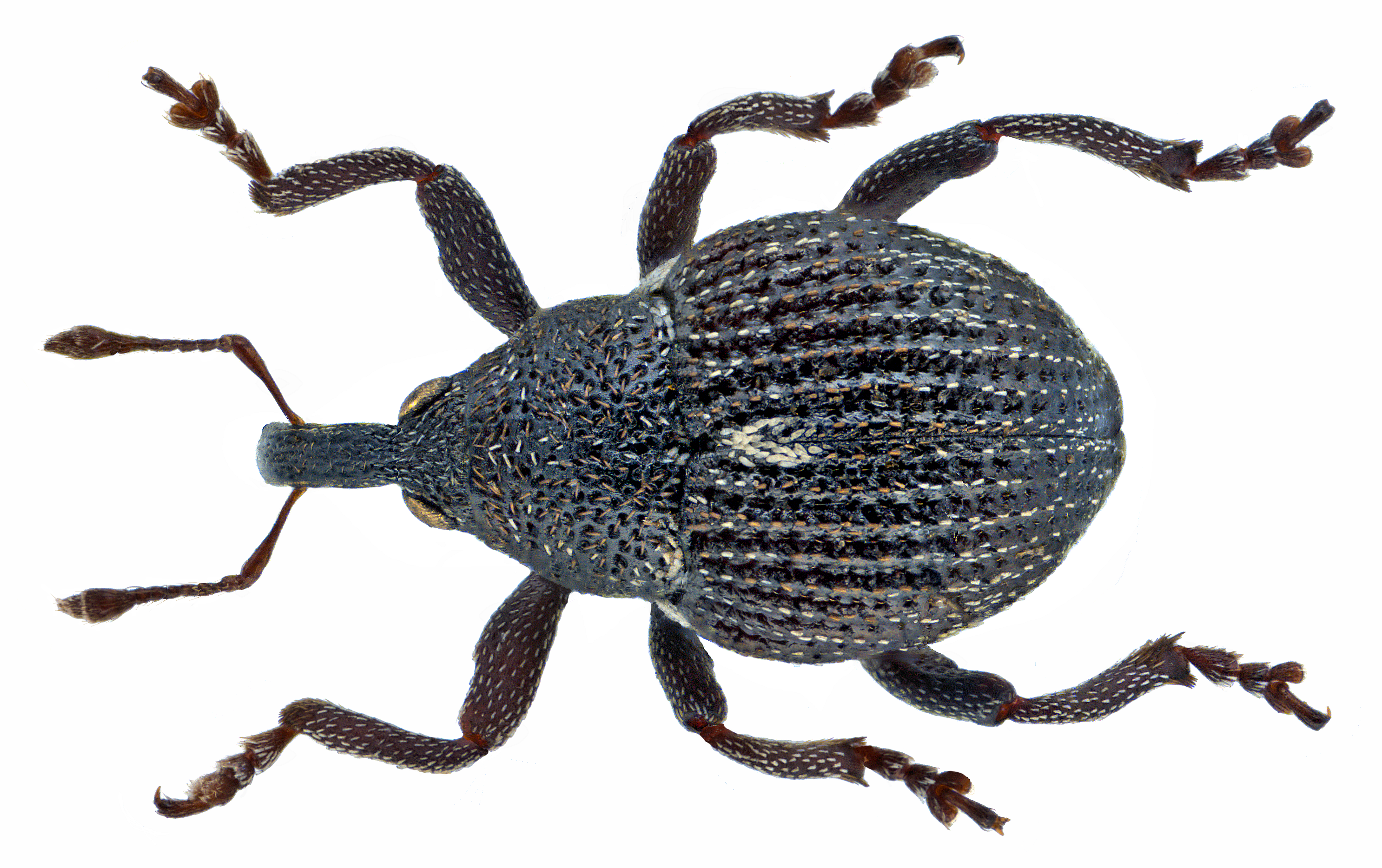
Rutidosoma globulus

Rutidosoma is a genus of beetles belonging to the family Curculionidae.

The species of this genus are found in Europe and Northern America.

Species:

- Rutidosoma alexanderi Korotyaev, 2008
- Rutidosoma caucasicum Korotyaev, 1989
