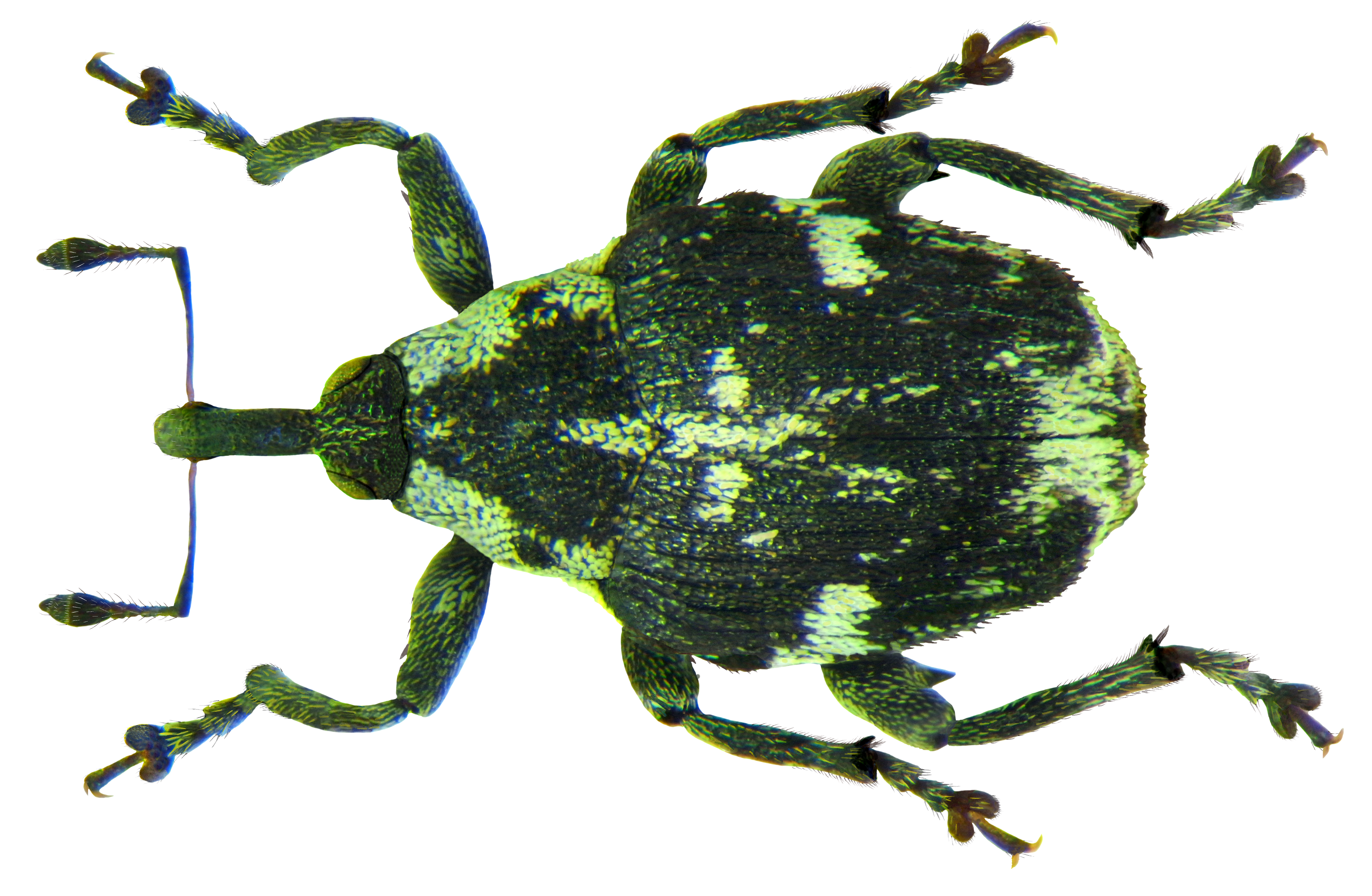
- Hadroplontus litura

Scientific classification
- Kingdom: Animalia
- Phylum: Arthropoda
- Class: Insecta
- Order: Coleoptera
- Suborder: Polyphaga
- Infraorder: Cucujiformia
- Family: Curculionidae
- Tribe: Ceutorhynchini
- Genus: Hadroplontus; C.G.Thomson, 1859

= Hadroplontus =

Genus of beetles

Hadroplontus is a genus of minute seed weevils in the family of beetles known as Curculionidae. There are at least two described species in Hadroplontus.

== Species ==
These two species belong to the genus Hadroplontus:

- Hadroplontus litura (Fabricius, 1775)^{c g b} (Canada thistle stem weevil)
- Hadroplontus trimaculatus (Fabricius, J.C., 1775)^{c g}

Data sources: i = ITIS, c = Catalogue of Life, g = GBIF, b = Bugguide.net
