= Acallodes =

Scientific classification
- Kingdom: Animalia
- Phylum: Arthropoda
- Clade: Pancrustacea
- Class: Insecta
- Order: Coleoptera
- Suborder: Polyphaga
- Infraorder: Cucujiformia
- Superfamily: Curculionoidea
- Family: Curculionidae
- Tribe: Scleropterini
- Genus: Acallodes; LeConte, 1876

Genus of beetles

Acallodes is a genus of minute seed weevils in the beetle family Curculionidae. There are at least three described species in Acallodes.

== Species ==
These three species belong to the genus Acallodes:

- Acallodes lysimachiae Fall, 1913^{i c}
- Acallodes saltoides Dietz, 1896^{i c b}
- Acallodes ventricosus LeConte, 1876^{i c b}

Data sources: i = ITIS, c = Catalogue of Life, g = GBIF, b = Bugguide.net
