= Rileyonymus =

Scientific classification
- Kingdom: Animalia
- Phylum: Arthropoda
- Class: Insecta
- Order: Coleoptera
- Suborder: Polyphaga
- Infraorder: Cucujiformia
- Family: Curculionidae
- Tribe: Ceutorhynchini
- Genus: Rileyonymus; Dietz, 1896

Genus of beetles

Rileyonymus is a genus of minute seed weevils in the beetle family Curculionidae. There is one described species in Rileyonymus, R. relictus.
