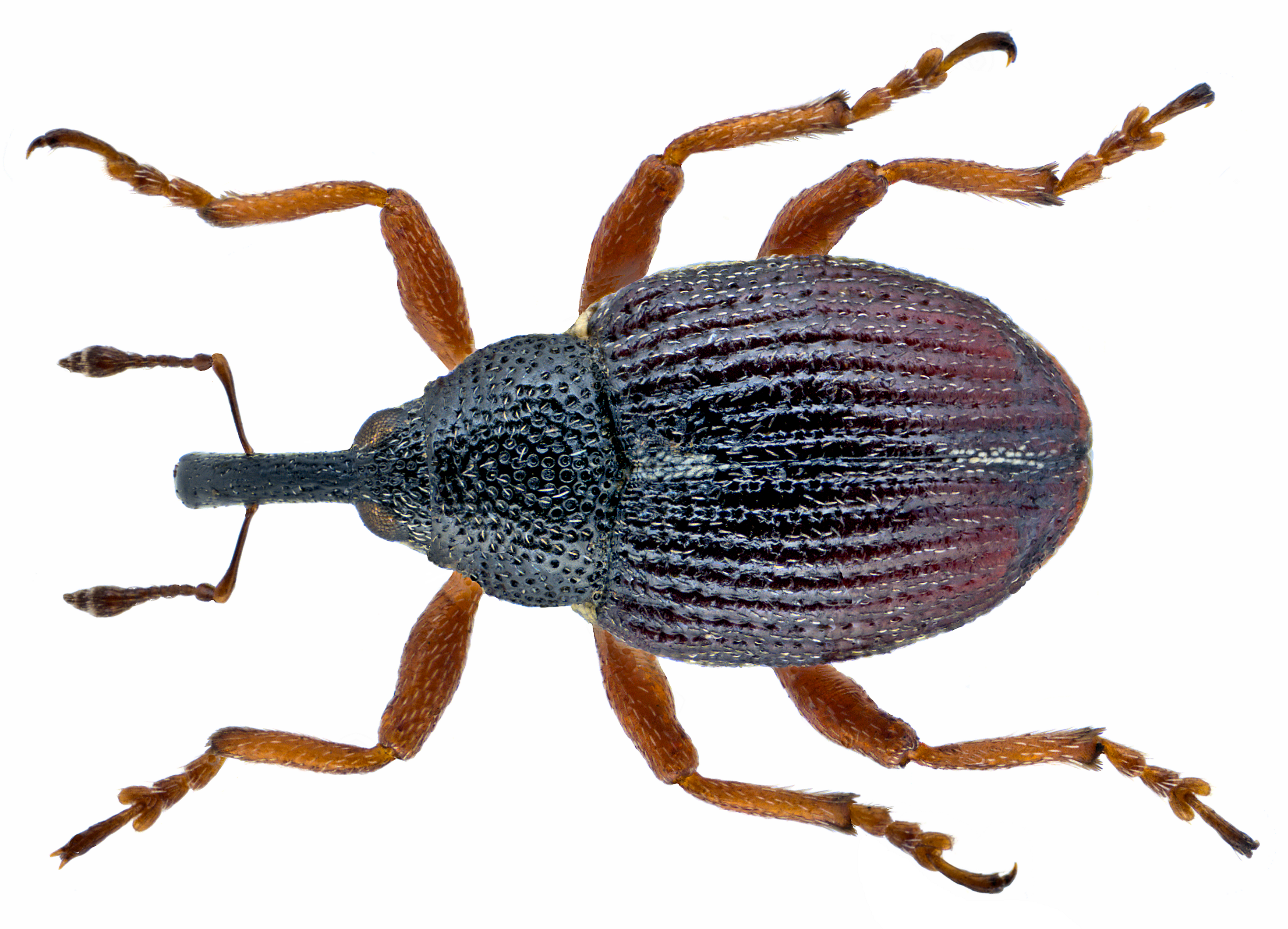
- Amalus scortillum

Scientific classification
- Domain: Eukaryota
- Kingdom: Animalia
- Phylum: Arthropoda
- Class: Insecta
- Order: Coleoptera
- Suborder: Polyphaga
- Infraorder: Cucujiformia
- Family: Curculionidae
- Tribe: Ceutorhynchini
- Genus: Amalus; Schönherr, 1825

= Amalus =

Genus of beetles

Amalus is a genus of minute seed weevils in the family Curculionidae. There are at least 2 described species in Amalus.

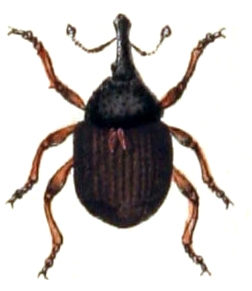
Amalus scortillum

== Species ==
- Amalus haemorrhous (Herbst, 1795)
- Amalus scortillum Schoenherr, 1825
