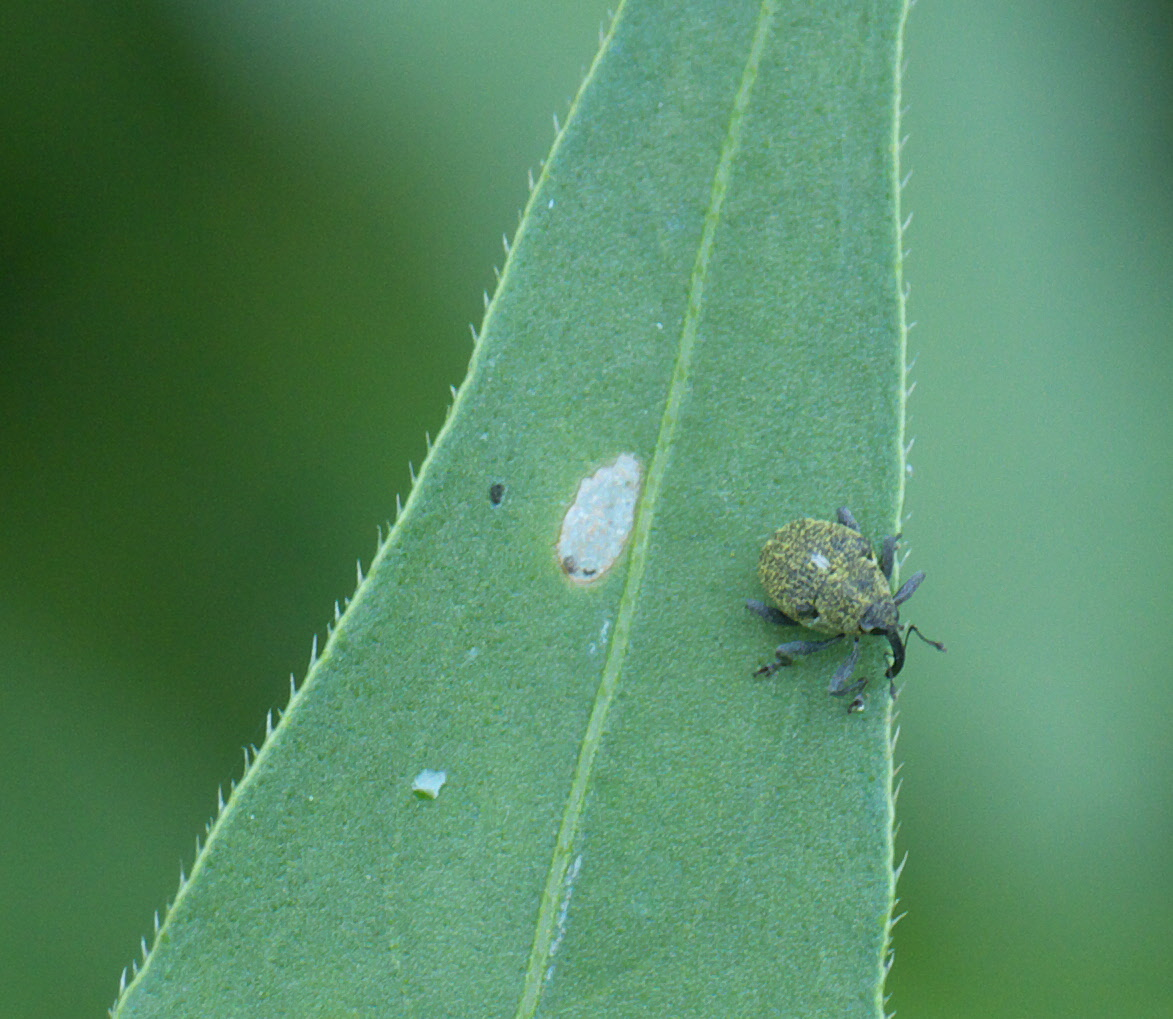
- Homorosoma sulcipenne

Scientific classification
- Domain: Eukaryota
- Kingdom: Animalia
- Phylum: Arthropoda
- Class: Insecta
- Order: Coleoptera
- Suborder: Polyphaga
- Infraorder: Cucujiformia
- Family: Curculionidae
- Tribe: Scleropterini
- Genus: Homorosoma; Frivaldszky, 1894

= Homorosoma =

Genus of beetles

Homorosoma is a genus of minute seed weevils in the family of beetles known as Curculionidae. There are about nine described species in Homorosoma.

== Species ==
These nine species belong to the genus Homorosoma:

- Homorosoma chinense Wagner, 1944^{c}
- Homorosoma consimile Wagner, 1944^{c}
- Homorosoma horridula Voss, 1958^{c}
- Homorosoma klapperichi Wagner, 1944^{c}
- Homorosoma rhytidosomoides Wagner, 1944^{c}
- Homorosoma speiseri Friv., 1893^{c}
- Homorosoma sulcipenne (LeConte, 1876)^{g b}
- Homorosoma sulcipennis (LeConte, 1876)^{i c}
- Homorosoma validirostre (Gyllenhal, 1837)^{g}

Data sources: i = ITIS, c = Catalogue of Life, g = GBIF, b = Bugguide.net
