= Marmaropus =

Scientific classification
- Domain: Eukaryota
- Kingdom: Animalia
- Phylum: Arthropoda
- Class: Insecta
- Order: Coleoptera
- Suborder: Polyphaga
- Infraorder: Cucujiformia
- Family: Curculionidae
- Genus: Marmaropus; Schönherr, 1837

Genus of beetles

Marmaropus is a genus of beetles belonging to the family Curculionidae.

The species of this genus are found in Europe.

Species:

- Marmaropus besseri Gyllenhal, 1837
- Marmaropus testaceitarsis Pic, 1908
