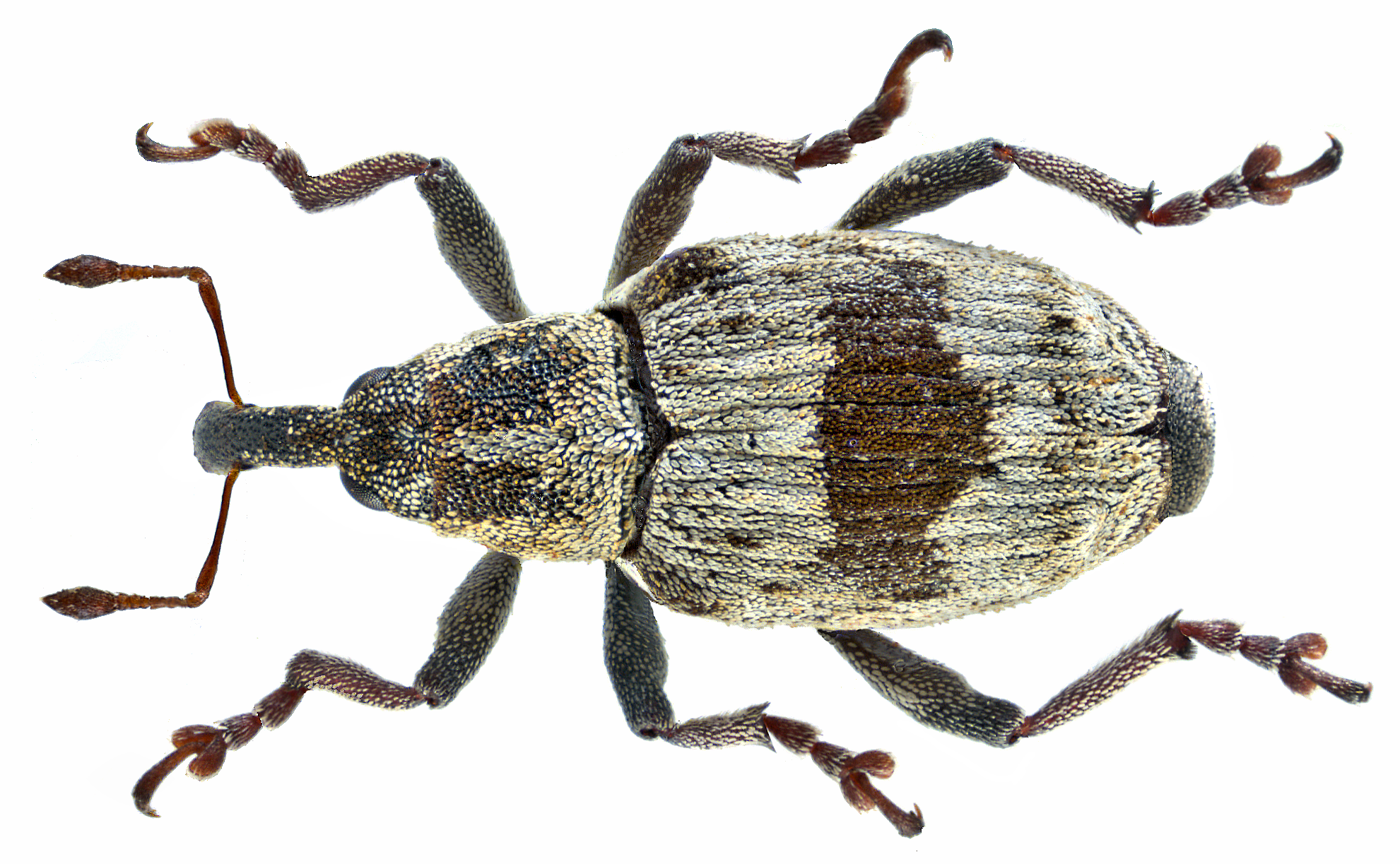

Scientific classification
- Kingdom: Animalia
- Phylum: Arthropoda
- Class: Insecta
- Order: Coleoptera
- Suborder: Polyphaga
- Infraorder: Cucujiformia
- Family: Curculionidae
- Subfamily: Ceutorhynchinae
- Genus: Tapinotus; Schönherr, 1826

Synonyms
- Tapeinotus (unavailable original misspelling)

= Tapinotus =

Genus of beetles

Tapinotus is a genus of beetles belonging to the family Curculionidae. In his original publication, Schönherr, 1826 mistakenly included the variant spelling Tapeinotus in the contents page (p.21), which was later adopted in various publications, however, in the main description and a corrigenda in same work, Schönherr clarified the preferred spelling as Tapeinotus, as recognised in Löbl & Smetana, 2013, and subsequent catalogs.

Species:

- Tapinotus sellatus (Fabricius, 1794)
