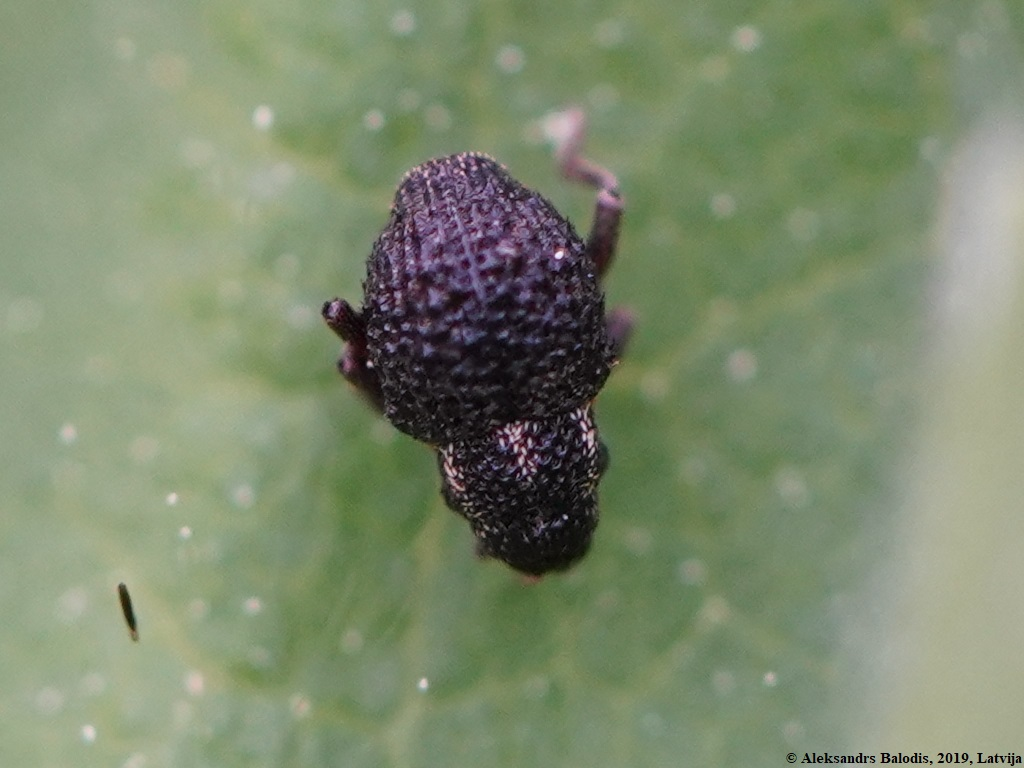
- Scleropterus serratus

Scientific classification
- Domain: Eukaryota
- Kingdom: Animalia
- Phylum: Arthropoda
- Class: Insecta
- Order: Coleoptera
- Suborder: Polyphaga
- Infraorder: Cucujiformia
- Family: Curculionidae
- Genus: Scleropterus; Schonherr, 1825

= Scleropterus =

Genus of beetles

Scleropterus is a genus of beetles belonging to the family Curculionidae.

Species:

- Scleropterus offensus
- Scleropterus serratus
