= Sirocalodes =

Scientific classification
- Domain: Eukaryota
- Kingdom: Animalia
- Phylum: Arthropoda
- Class: Insecta
- Order: Coleoptera
- Suborder: Polyphaga
- Infraorder: Cucujiformia
- Family: Curculionidae
- Genus: Sirocalodes; Voss, 1958

Genus of beetles

Sirocalodes is a genus of beetles belonging to the family Curculionidae.

Species:

- Sirocalodes depressicollis
- Sirocalodes mixtus
- Sirocalodes nigroterminatus
