= Datonychus =

Scientific classification
- Domain: Eukaryota
- Kingdom: Animalia
- Phylum: Arthropoda
- Class: Insecta
- Order: Coleoptera
- Suborder: Polyphaga
- Infraorder: Cucujiformia
- Family: Curculionidae
- Genus: Datonychus; Wagner, 1944

Genus of beetles

Datonychus is a genus of beetles belonging to the family Curculionidae.

The species of this genus are found in Europe.

Species:

- Datonychus arquata (Herbst, 1795)
