= Neoxyonyx =

Scientific classification
- Domain: Eukaryota
- Kingdom: Animalia
- Phylum: Arthropoda
- Class: Insecta
- Order: Coleoptera
- Suborder: Polyphaga
- Infraorder: Cucujiformia
- Family: Curculionidae
- Genus: Neoxyonyx; Hoffmann, 1930

Genus of insects

Neoxyonyx is a genus of beetles belonging to the family Curculionidae.

Species:

- Neoxyonyx monticola Desbr., 1895
- Neoxyonyx strigatirostris Colonnelli, 1995
