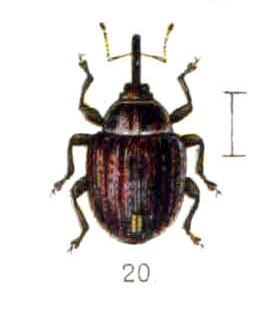
- Stenocarus cardui

Scientific classification
- Domain: Eukaryota
- Kingdom: Animalia
- Phylum: Arthropoda
- Class: Insecta
- Order: Coleoptera
- Suborder: Polyphaga
- Infraorder: Cucujiformia
- Family: Curculionidae
- Genus: Stenocarus; Thomson, 1859

= Stenocarus =

Genus of beetles

Stenocarus is a genus of beetles belonging to the family Curculionidae. The species of this genus are found in Europe.

== Species ==
- Stenocarus canaliculatus Gyll, 1837
- Stenocarus cardui (Herbst, 1784)
- Stenocarus ruficornis Stephens, 1831
