= Microplontus =

Scientific classification
- Kingdom: Animalia
- Phylum: Arthropoda
- Class: Insecta
- Order: Coleoptera
- Suborder: Polyphaga
- Infraorder: Cucujiformia
- Family: Curculionidae
- Genus: Microplontus

Genus of beetles

Microplontus is a genus of beetles belonging to the family Curculionidae.

he species of this genus are found in Europe.

Species:

- Microplontus amurensis Korotyaev, 2004
- Microplontus fairmairii (Brisout de Barneville, 1881)
