= Neoglocianus =

Scientific classification
- Domain: Eukaryota
- Kingdom: Animalia
- Phylum: Arthropoda
- Class: Insecta
- Order: Coleoptera
- Suborder: Polyphaga
- Infraorder: Cucujiformia
- Family: Curculionidae
- Genus: Neoglocianus; Dieckmann, 1972

Genus of insects

Neoglocianus is a genus of beetles belonging to the family Curculionidae.

The species of this genus are found in Central Europe.

Species:

- Neoglocianus maculaalba (Herbst, 1795)
