= A. ater =

A. ater may refer to:

- Abacetus ater, a ground beetle found in Australia
- Achalinus ater, Bourret's odd-scaled snake, found in Vietnam and China
- Agrilinus ater, a scarab beetle found in the Palearctic
  - Aphodius ater, a synonym of Agrilinus ater
- Aiteng ater, a sea slug found in Thailand
- Ampeloglypter ater, a weevil
- Anguis ater, a synonym of Anilius scytale, a snake found in South America
- Anthonomus ater, a weevil found in North America
- Apalone ater, a synonym of the subspecies Apalone spinifera atra, the black spiny softshell, a turtle found in Mexico
- Arion ater, the black slug, a gastropod native to Europe and invasive to North America and Australia
- Armadillo ater, a synonym of Armadillidium vulgare, the common pill bug or potato bug, an isopod native to Europe and found across the world
- Aulacomya ater, a synonym of Aulacomya atra, a saltwater mussel found in the Southern Hemisphere
- Auleutes ater, a weevil found in North America
