= A. curtus =

A. curtus may refer to:

- Abacetus curtus, a ground beetle
- Acanthoscelidius curtus, a weevil found in North America
- Amblytelus curtus, a ground beetle
- Aspidoboa curtus, a synonym of Python curtus, the Sumatran short-tailed python
- Athous curtus, a click beetle found in the Western Caucasus
