= Agrilinus pseudolungaiensis =

Scientific classification
- Kingdom: Animalia
- Phylum: Arthropoda
- Clade: Pancrustacea
- Class: Insecta
- Order: Coleoptera
- Suborder: Polyphaga
- Infraorder: Scarabaeiformia
- Family: Scarabaeidae
- Genus: Agrilinus
- Species: A. pseudolungaiensis

Binomial name
- Agrilinus pseudolungaiensis Mencl & Rakovič, 2012

Species of beetle

Agrilinus pseudolungaiensis is a species of beetle of the family Scarabaeidae. It is found in China (Shaanxi).

== Description ==
Adults reach a length of about 3.8–4.7 mm (0.15–0.19 in). They have an oblong-oval, glabrous, moderately shining body. The head is black, and the pronotum is black with reddish yellow lateral margins. The elytra are dark brown to black with reddish yellow markings and a reddish-yellow apex. The legs are dark brown.

== Etymology ==
The species name is derived from pseudo- (meaning false) and the name of the very similar species Agrilinus lungaiensis.
