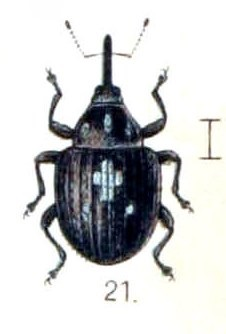
- Auleutes epilobii

Scientific classification
- Kingdom: Animalia
- Phylum: Arthropoda
- Class: Insecta
- Order: Coleoptera
- Suborder: Polyphaga
- Infraorder: Cucujiformia
- Family: Curculionidae
- Subfamily: Ceutorhynchinae
- Tribe: Cnemogonini

= Cnemogonini =

Tribe of beetles

Cnemogonini is a tribe of minute seed weevils in the family of beetles known as Curculionidae. There are 15 genera in Cnemogonini.

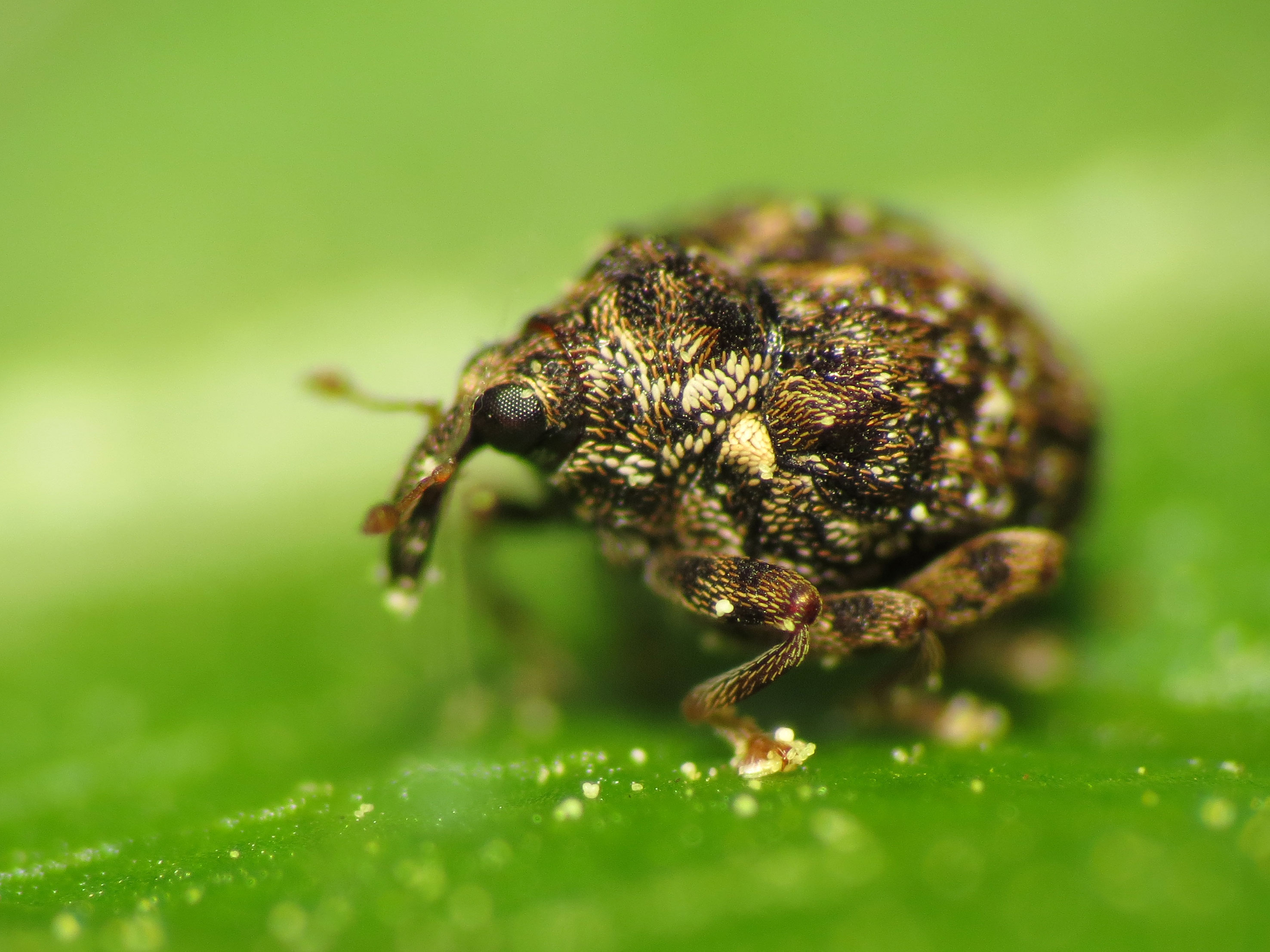
Orchestomerus

== Selected genera ==
- Acanthoscelidius Hustache, 1930^{i c g b}
- Asperauleutes^{b}
- Auleutes Dietz, 1896^{i c g b}
- Cnemogonus LeConte, 1876^{i c g b}
- Craponius LeConte, 1876^{i c g b}
- Dietzella Champion, 1907^{i g b}
- Orchestomerus Dietz, 1896^{c g b}
- Parauleutes Colonnelli, 2004^{g b}
- Pelenosomus Dietz, 1896^{i c g b}
- Perigaster Dietz, 1896^{i c g b}
- Perigasteromimus Colonnelli, 1999^{c g b}

Data sources: i = ITIS, c = Catalogue of Life, g = GBIF, b = Bugguide.net
