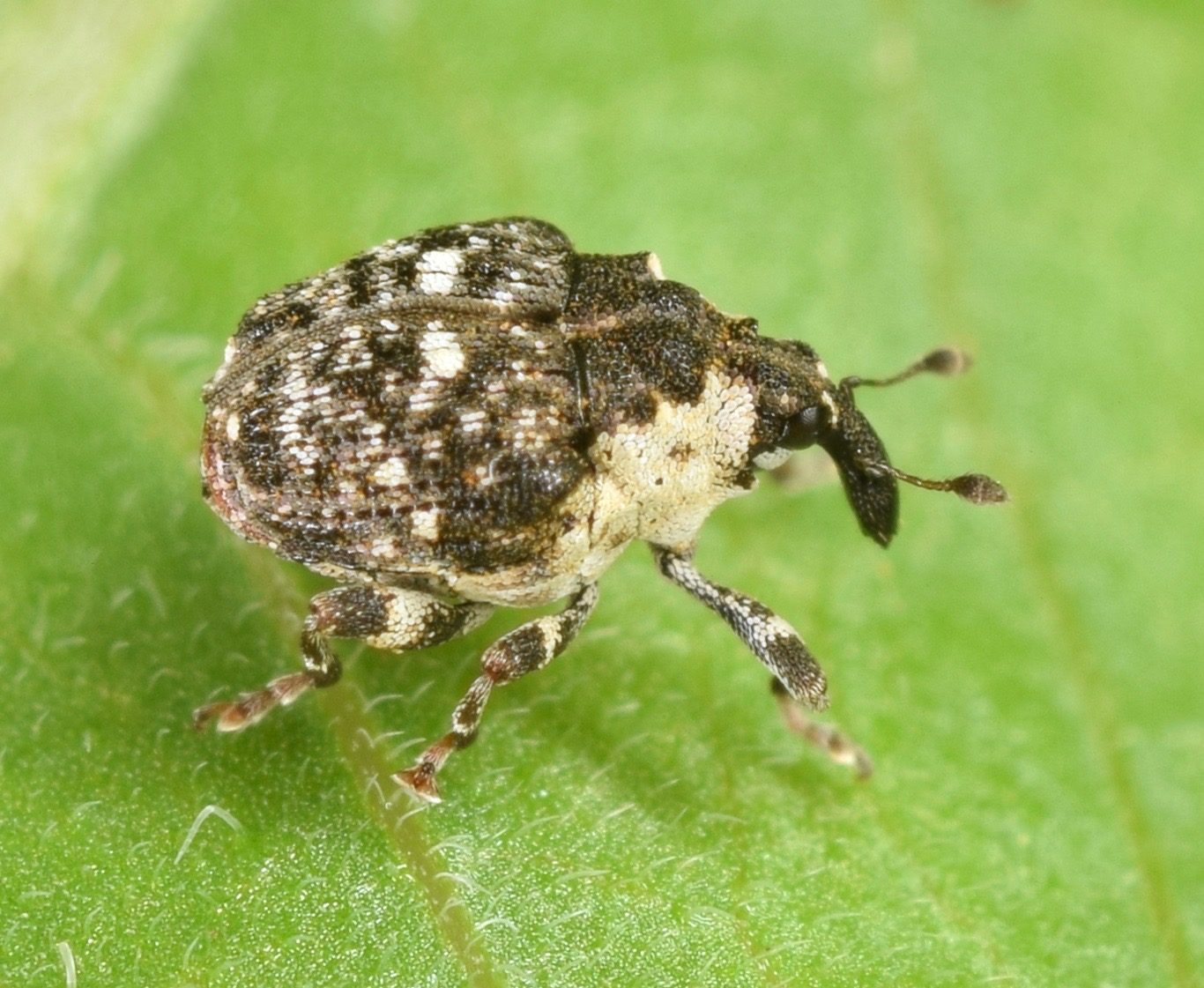

Scientific classification
- Kingdom: Animalia
- Phylum: Arthropoda
- Clade: Pancrustacea
- Class: Insecta
- Order: Coleoptera
- Suborder: Polyphaga
- Infraorder: Cucujiformia
- Family: Curculionidae
- Genus: Dietzella
- Species: D. zimmermanni

Binomial name
- Dietzella zimmermanni (Gyllenhal, 1837)

Synonyms
- Coelogaster zimmermanni Gyllenhal, 1837; Dietzella zimmermannii (Gyllenhal, 1837) (Missp.)

= Dietzella zimmermanni =

Species of beetle

Dietzella zimmermanni is a species of minute seed weevil in the beetle family Curculionidae. It is found in North America. Larvae feed on leaves of Oenothera pilosella, Epilobium, and Circaea lutetiana.
