= Acanthoscelidius acephalus =

Scientific classification
- Domain: Eukaryota
- Kingdom: Animalia
- Phylum: Arthropoda
- Class: Insecta
- Order: Coleoptera
- Suborder: Polyphaga
- Infraorder: Cucujiformia
- Family: Curculionidae
- Genus: Acanthoscelidius
- Species: A. acephalus

Binomial name
- Acanthoscelidius acephalus (Say, 1824)

Synonyms
- Acanthoscelis tenebrosus Dietz, 1896; Coeliodes leprosus Boheman, 1844; Coeliodes subulirostris Gyllenhal, 1837

Species of beetle

Acanthoscelidius acephalus is a species of minute seed weevil in the family of beetles known as Curculionidae. It is found in North America. It feeds on the leaves of Oenothera biennis.
