= Agrilinus breviusculus =

Scientific classification
- Kingdom: Animalia
- Phylum: Arthropoda
- Clade: Pancrustacea
- Class: Insecta
- Order: Coleoptera
- Suborder: Polyphaga
- Infraorder: Scarabaeiformia
- Family: Scarabaeidae
- Genus: Agrilinus
- Species: A. breviusculus

Binomial name
- Agrilinus breviusculus (Motschulsky, 1866)

Synonyms
- Calamosternus breviusculus Motschulsky, 1866; Aphodius trituberculatus Schmidt, 1907; Ammoecius nitidulus Waterhouse, 1875; Aphodius nigerrimus Waterhouse, 1875; Aphodius ovalis Waterhouse, 1875

Species of beetle

Agrilinus breviusculus is a species of beetle of the family Scarabaeidae. It is found in Japan (Hokkaido to Kyushu), China (Sichuan), Korea and the Russian Far East.

== Description ==
Adults reach a length of about 4.5–5.5 mm (0.18–0.22 in). They have a convex, oval, shiny, black body.
