= Auleutes subfasciatus =

Scientific classification
- Domain: Eukaryota
- Kingdom: Animalia
- Phylum: Arthropoda
- Class: Insecta
- Order: Coleoptera
- Suborder: Polyphaga
- Infraorder: Cucujiformia
- Family: Curculionidae
- Genus: Auleutes
- Species: A. subfasciatus

Binomial name
- Auleutes subfasciatus Dietz, 1896

Species of beetle

Auleutes subfasciatus is a species of minute seed weevil in the beetle family Curculionidae. It is found in North America.
