= Perigaster =

Scientific classification
- Kingdom: Animalia
- Phylum: Arthropoda
- Class: Insecta
- Order: Coleoptera
- Suborder: Polyphaga
- Infraorder: Cucujiformia
- Family: Curculionidae
- Tribe: Cnemogonini
- Genus: Perigaster; Dietz, 1896

Genus of beetles

Perigaster is a genus of minute seed weevils in the beetle family Curculionidae. There are about seven described species in Perigaster.

== Species ==
These seven species belong to the genus Perigaster:

- Perigaster alternans Blatchley, 1928^{i c}
- Perigaster cretura (Herbst, 1797)^{i c g b}
- Perigaster liturata (Dietz, 1896)^{i}
- Perigaster lituratus Buchanan, 1937^{c}
- Perigaster longirostris Buchanan, 1931^{c}
- Perigaster obscura (LeConte, 1876)^{i b}
- Perigaster tetracantha Champion,^{c}

Data sources: i = ITIS, c = Catalogue of Life, g = GBIF, b = Bugguide.net
