= Agrilinus surdus =

Scientific classification
- Kingdom: Animalia
- Phylum: Arthropoda
- Clade: Pancrustacea
- Class: Insecta
- Order: Coleoptera
- Suborder: Polyphaga
- Infraorder: Scarabaeiformia
- Family: Scarabaeidae
- Genus: Agrilinus
- Species: A. surdus

Binomial name
- Agrilinus surdus (Boucomont, 1929)

Synonyms
- Aphodius (Agrilinus) surdus Boucomont, 1929

Species of beetle

Agrilinus surdus is a species of beetle of the family Scarabaeidae. It is found in China (Sichuan).

== Description ==
Adults reach a length of about 3.5–4 mm (0.14–0.16 in). They have an oval, strongly convex, glabrous, dull body, with the anterior angles of the pronotum slightly translucent.
