= Agrilinus tenax =

Scientific classification
- Kingdom: Animalia
- Phylum: Arthropoda
- Clade: Pancrustacea
- Class: Insecta
- Order: Coleoptera
- Suborder: Polyphaga
- Infraorder: Scarabaeiformia
- Family: Scarabaeidae
- Genus: Agrilinus
- Species: A. tenax

Binomial name
- Agrilinus tenax (Balthasar, 1932)

Synonyms
- Aphodius tenax Balthasar, 1932

Species of beetle

Agrilinus tenax is a species of beetle of the family Scarabaeidae. It is found in China (Sichuan) and the Russian Far East.

== Description ==
Adults reach a length of about 4.5–6 mm (0.18–0.24 in). They have a strongly convex, shining, glabrous, black body, with the tips of the elytra reddish and translucent.
