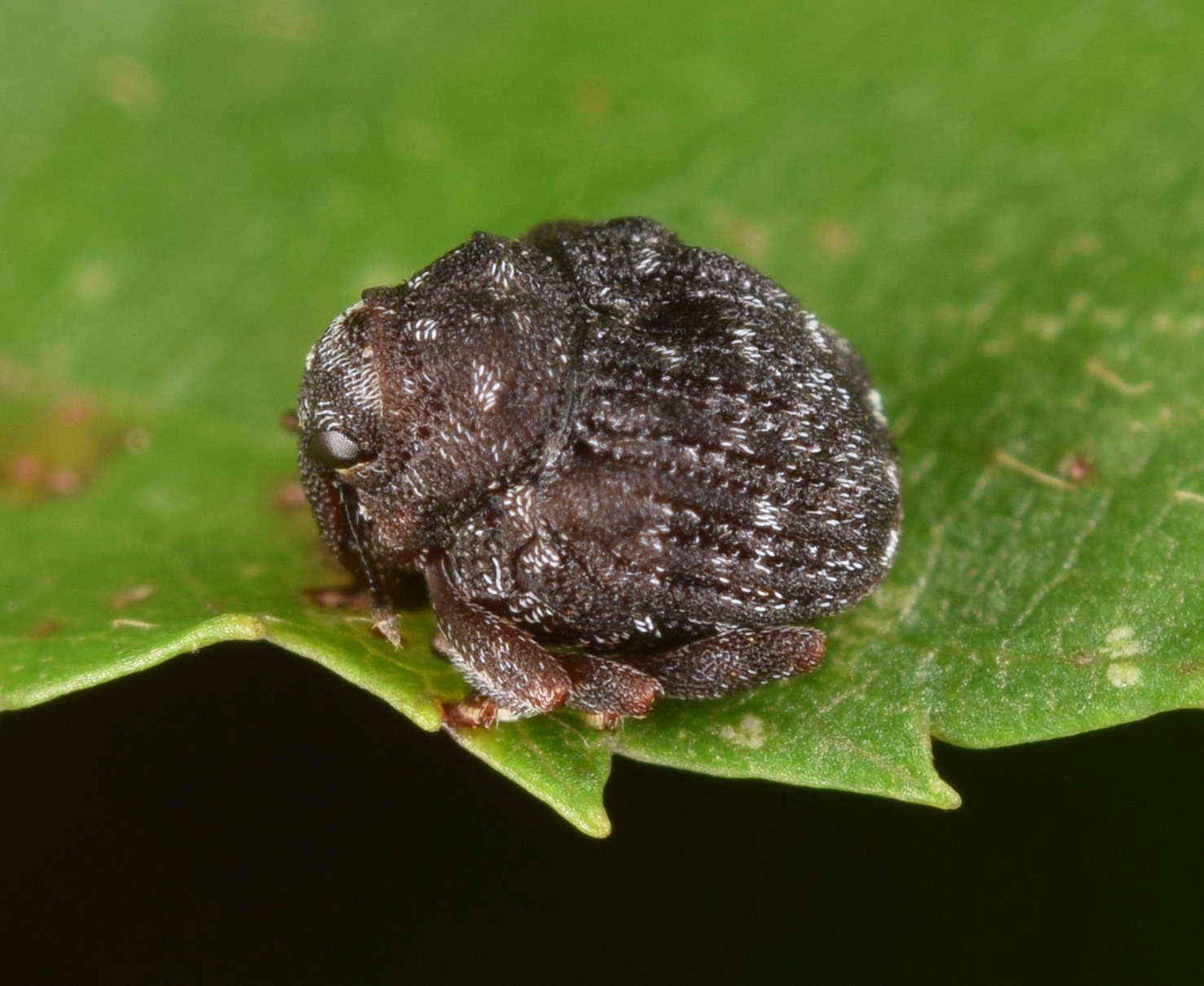

Scientific classification
- Domain: Eukaryota
- Kingdom: Animalia
- Phylum: Arthropoda
- Class: Insecta
- Order: Coleoptera
- Suborder: Polyphaga
- Infraorder: Cucujiformia
- Family: Curculionidae
- Genus: Craponius
- Species: C. inaequalis

Binomial name
- Craponius inaequalis (Say, 1831)

= Craponius inaequalis =

Species of beetle

Craponius inaequalis, commonly known as the grape curculio, is a species of minute seed weevil in the beetle family Curculionidae. The species is found in North America.
