= Agrilinus punctator =

Scientific classification
- Kingdom: Animalia
- Phylum: Arthropoda
- Clade: Pancrustacea
- Class: Insecta
- Order: Coleoptera
- Suborder: Polyphaga
- Infraorder: Scarabaeiformia
- Family: Scarabaeidae
- Genus: Agrilinus
- Species: A. punctator

Binomial name
- Agrilinus punctator (Reitter, 1892)

Synonyms
- Aphodius (Agrilinus) punctator Reitter, 1892

Species of beetle

Agrilinus punctator is a species of beetle of the family Scarabaeidae. It is found in China (Xinjiang).

== Description ==
Adults reach a length of about 4.5–5 mm (0.18–0.20 in). They have a quite strongly convex, elongate, shiny, black body, with the tips of the elytra reddish.
