= Agrilinus ishidai =

Scientific classification
- Kingdom: Animalia
- Phylum: Arthropoda
- Clade: Pancrustacea
- Class: Insecta
- Order: Coleoptera
- Suborder: Polyphaga
- Infraorder: Scarabaeiformia
- Family: Scarabaeidae
- Genus: Agrilinus
- Species: A. ishidai

Binomial name
- Agrilinus ishidai (Masumoto & Kiuchi, 1987)

Synonyms
- Aphodius (Agrilinus) ishidai Masumoto & Kiuchi, 1987

Species of beetle

Agrilinus ishidai is a species of beetle of the family Scarabaeidae. It is found in Japan (Honshu).

== Description ==
Adults reach a length of about 4.1–5.2 mm (0.16–0.20 in). They have a rather elongate, fairly robust, subparallel-sided, strongly convex, strongly shining, black body, with the outer margins of head and pronotum reddish-brown.

== Life history ==
Specimens have been collected from the excrement of wild Japanese monkeys and deer.
