= Agrilinus bollowi =

Scientific classification
- Kingdom: Animalia
- Phylum: Arthropoda
- Clade: Pancrustacea
- Class: Insecta
- Order: Coleoptera
- Suborder: Polyphaga
- Infraorder: Scarabaeiformia
- Family: Scarabaeidae
- Genus: Agrilinus
- Species: A. bollowi

Binomial name
- Agrilinus bollowi (Balthasar, 1941)

Synonyms
- Aphodius (Agrilinus) bollowi Balthasar, 1941

Species of beetle

Agrilinus bollowi is a species of beetle of the family Scarabaeidae. It is found in southern China (Fujian).

== Description ==
Adults reach a length of about 4.5 mm (0.18 in). They have a quite short, strongly convex, shiny, almost glabrous, blackish-brown body, with the pronotum edged with reddish on the sides. The elytra are yellowish-brown with dark markings and the legs are brown.
