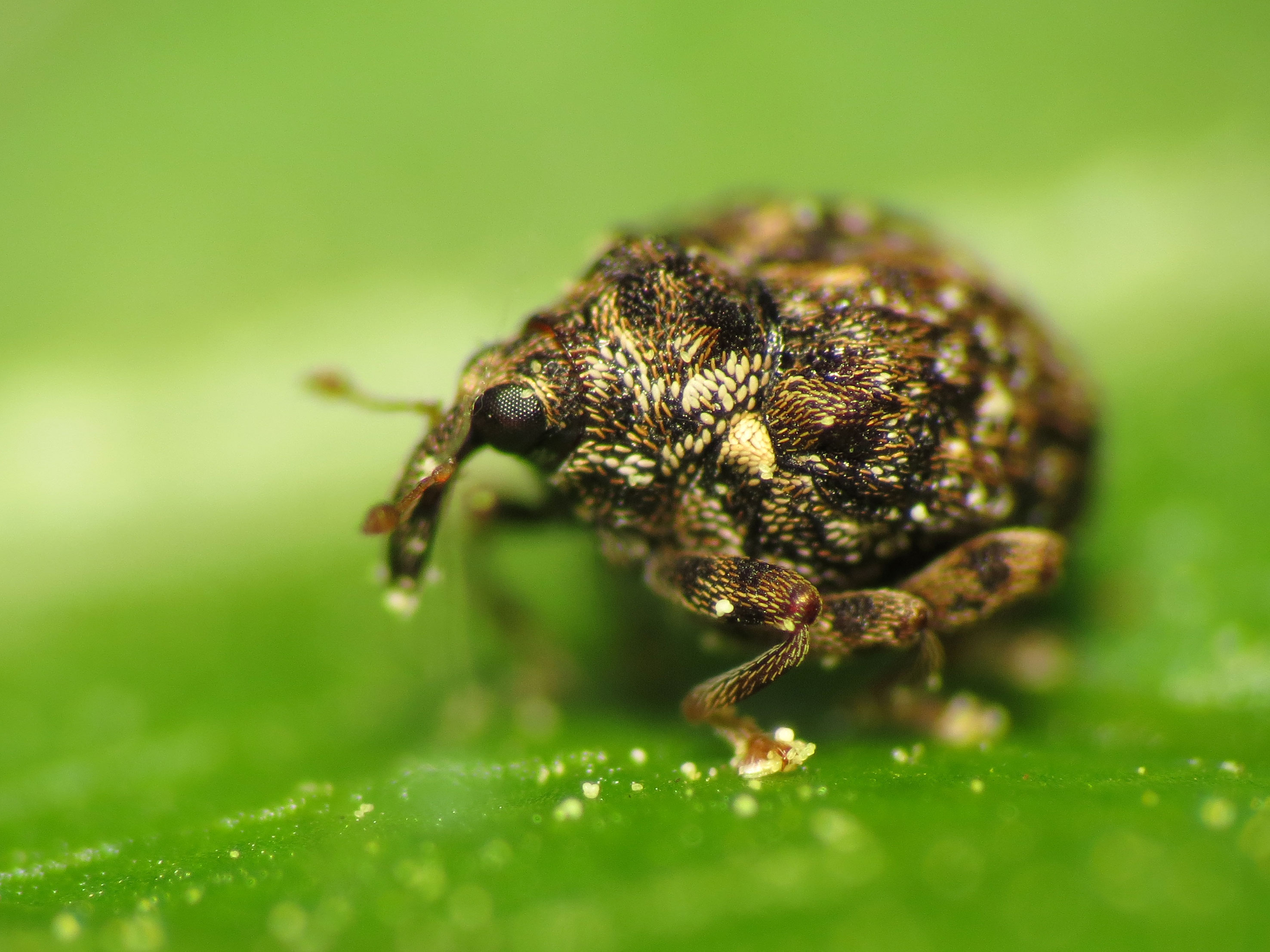

Scientific classification
- Domain: Eukaryota
- Kingdom: Animalia
- Phylum: Arthropoda
- Class: Insecta
- Order: Coleoptera
- Suborder: Polyphaga
- Infraorder: Cucujiformia
- Family: Curculionidae
- Tribe: Cnemogonini
- Genus: Orchestomerus; Dietz, 1896

= Orchestomerus =

Genus of beetles

Orchestomerus is a genus of minute seed weevils in the family of beetles known as Curculionidae. There are about 14 described species in Orchestomerus.

== Species ==
These 14 species belong to the genus Orchestomerus:

- Orchestomerus bicarinatus Colonnelli, 1991^{c}
- Orchestomerus chiriquensis Colonnelli, 1991^{c}
- Orchestomerus eisemani^{b}
- Orchestomerus gibbicollis Colonnelli, 1991^{c}
- Orchestomerus marionis^{b}
- Orchestomerus modestus Colonnelli, 1991^{c}
- Orchestomerus nodicollis Colonnelli, 1994^{c}
- Orchestomerus phytobioides Colonnelli, 1991^{c}
- Orchestomerus pleurostigma Colonnelli, 1991^{c}
- Orchestomerus subsultans Colonnelli, 1994^{c}
- Orchestomerus suturalis Colonnelli, 1991^{c}
- Orchestomerus ulkei Dietz, 1896^{c}
- Orchestomerus whiteheadi Colonnelli, 1991^{c b}
- Orchestomerus wickhami^{b}

Data sources: i = ITIS, c = Catalogue of Life, g = GBIF, b = Bugguide.net
