= Agrilinus bardus =

Scientific classification
- Kingdom: Animalia
- Phylum: Arthropoda
- Clade: Pancrustacea
- Class: Insecta
- Order: Coleoptera
- Suborder: Polyphaga
- Infraorder: Scarabaeiformia
- Family: Scarabaeidae
- Genus: Agrilinus
- Species: A. bardus

Binomial name
- Agrilinus bardus (Balthasar, 1946)

Synonyms
- Aphodius (Agrilinus) bardus Balthasar, 1946

Species of beetle

Agrilinus bardus is a species of beetle of the family Scarabaeidae. It is found in China (Jilin), the Russian Far East and Siberia.

== Description ==
Adults reach a length of about 4.5 mm (0.18 in). They have an elongate, moderately convex, shining, glabrous, black body, with the sides of the pronotum and most of the elytra reddish-brown. The underside is brown and the legs are dark brown.
