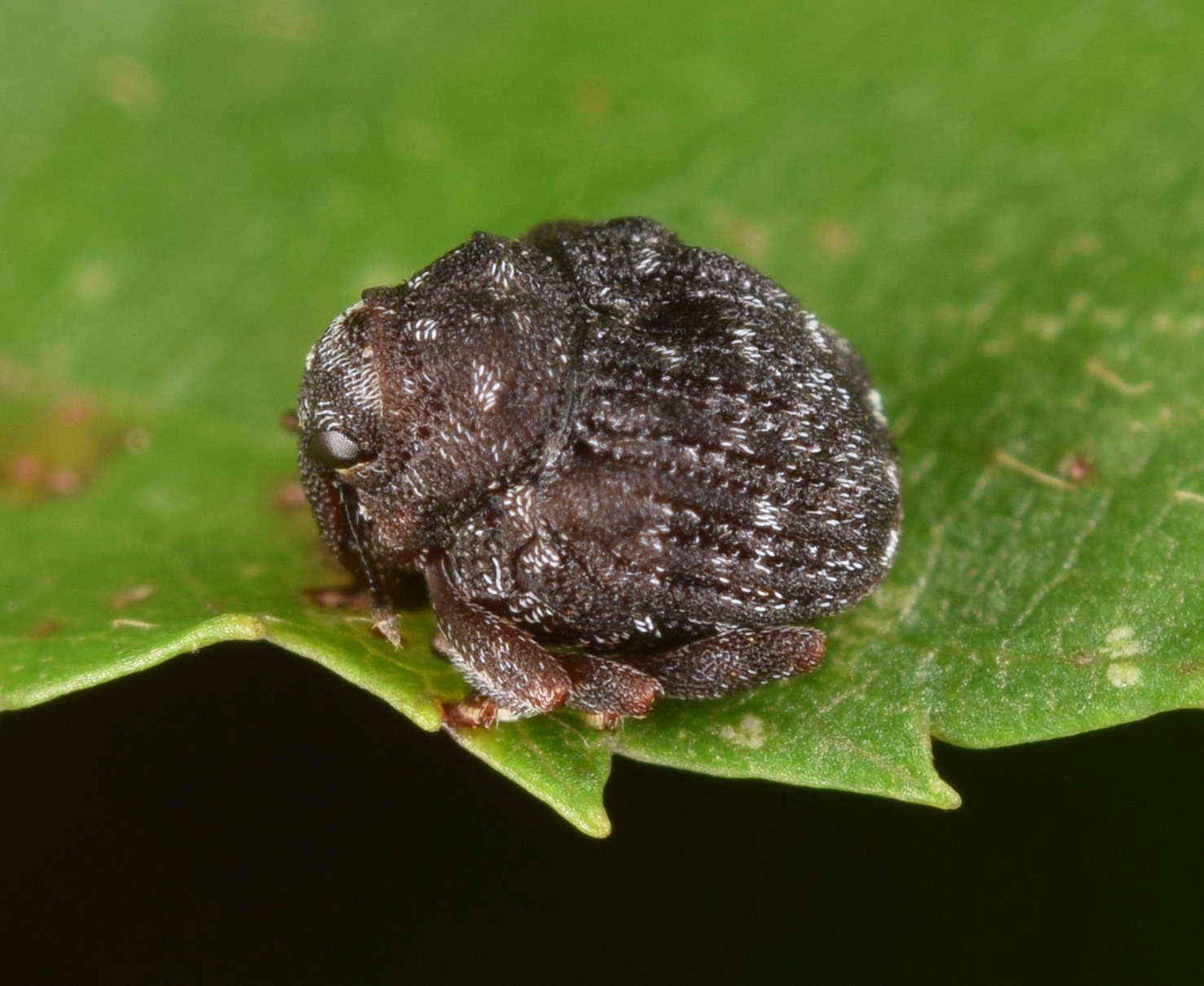
- Craponius inaequalis

Scientific classification
- Kingdom: Animalia
- Phylum: Arthropoda
- Class: Insecta
- Order: Coleoptera
- Suborder: Polyphaga
- Infraorder: Cucujiformia
- Family: Curculionidae
- Tribe: Cnemogonini
- Genus: Craponius; LeConte, 1876

= Craponius =

Genus of beetles

Craponius is a genus of minute seed weevils in the beetle family Curculionidae. There are at least three described species in Craponius.

== Species ==
These three species belong to the genus Craponius:

- Craponius bigibbosus Hustache, 1916^{c}
- Craponius epilobii Seidlitz, 1891^{c}
- Craponius inaequalis (Say, 1831)^{i b} (grape curculio)

Data sources: i = ITIS, c = Catalogue of Life, g = GBIF, b = Bugguide.net
