= Agrilinus hasegawai =

Scientific classification
- Kingdom: Animalia
- Phylum: Arthropoda
- Clade: Pancrustacea
- Class: Insecta
- Order: Coleoptera
- Suborder: Polyphaga
- Infraorder: Scarabaeiformia
- Family: Scarabaeidae
- Genus: Agrilinus
- Species: A. hasegawai

Binomial name
- Agrilinus hasegawai (Nomura & Nakane, 1951)

Synonyms
- Aphodius (Agrilinus) hasegawai Nomura & Nakane, 1951; Aphodius (Agrilinus) hasegawai aka Nakane, 1960; Aphodius (Agrilinus) hasegawai akahane Nakane, 1960

Species of beetle

Agrilinus hasegawai is a species of beetle of the family Scarabaeidae. It is found in Japan, Korea and the Russian Far East.

== Description ==
Adults reach a length of about 4 mm (0.16 in).
