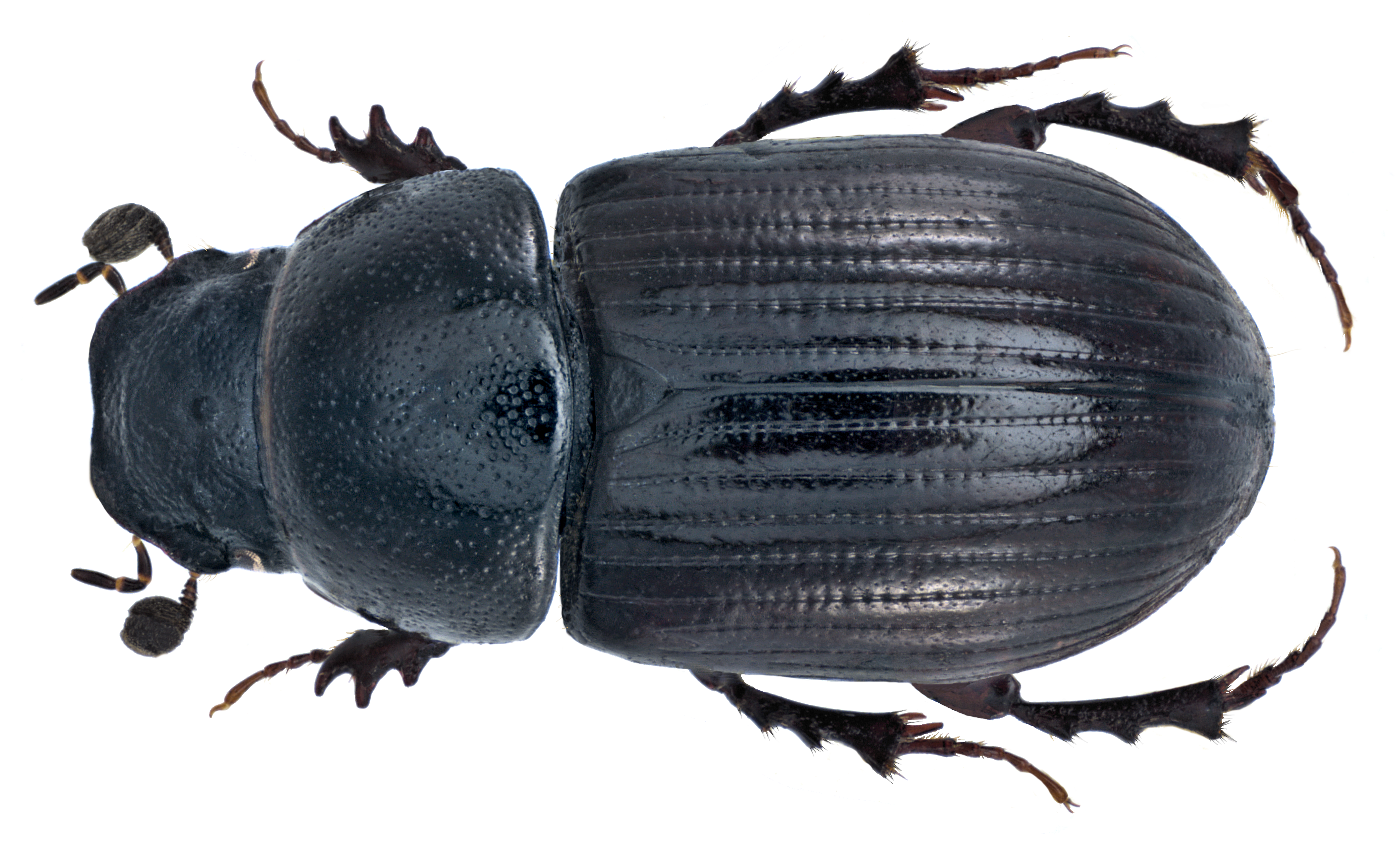

Scientific classification
- Kingdom: Animalia
- Phylum: Arthropoda
- Clade: Pancrustacea
- Class: Insecta
- Order: Coleoptera
- Suborder: Polyphaga
- Infraorder: Scarabaeiformia
- Family: Scarabaeidae
- Genus: Agrilinus
- Species: A. constans

Binomial name
- Agrilinus constans (Duftschmid, 1805)

Synonyms
- Aphodius constans Duftschmid, 1805; Aphodius nomas Kolenati, 1846; Aphodius exiguus Mulsant, 1842; Aphodius vernus Mulsant, 1842; Aphodius vernus martialis Mulsant, 1842; Aphodius nitidus Stephens, 1830

= Agrilinus constans =

Species of beetle

Agrilinus constans is a species of beetle of the family Scarabaeidae. It is found in Albania, Armenia, Austria, Belgium, Bosnia Herzegovina, Croatia, Slovenia, the Czech Republic, France, Germany, Georgia, Great Britain, Greece, Ireland, Italy, Lebanon, Macedonia, Malta, Poland, Portugal, Romania, Russia, Slovakia, Spain, Switzerland, Turkey, Turkmenistan and Ukraine.

== Description ==
Adults reach a length of about 5–6 mm (0.20–0.24 in). They have a rather strongly convex, oblong, glabrous, glossy, black body. The elytra have reddish tips.
