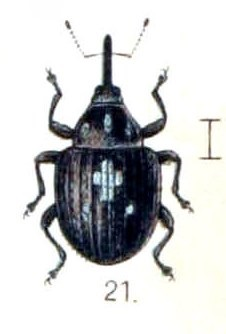

Scientific classification
- Kingdom: Animalia
- Phylum: Arthropoda
- Clade: Pancrustacea
- Class: Insecta
- Order: Coleoptera
- Suborder: Polyphaga
- Infraorder: Cucujiformia
- Superfamily: Curculionoidea
- Family: Curculionidae
- Genus: Auleutes
- Species: A. epilobii

Binomial name
- Auleutes epilobii (Paykull, 1800)

Synonyms
- Coeliodes cruralis LeConte, 1876

= Auleutes epilobii =

Species of beetle

Auleutes epilobii is a species of minute seed weevil in the beetle family Curculionidae. It is found in North America, as well as northern Eurasia, where it is found on Chamaenerion angustifolium plants.
