= Agrilinus spinulosus =

Scientific classification
- Kingdom: Animalia
- Phylum: Arthropoda
- Clade: Pancrustacea
- Class: Insecta
- Order: Coleoptera
- Suborder: Polyphaga
- Infraorder: Scarabaeiformia
- Family: Scarabaeidae
- Genus: Agrilinus
- Species: A. spinulosus

Binomial name
- Agrilinus spinulosus (Schmidt, 1910)

Synonyms
- Aphodius spinulosus Schmidt, 1910

Species of beetle

Agrilinus spinulosus is a species of beetle of the family Scarabaeidae. It is found in China (Liaoning, Yunnan, Zhejiang).

== Description ==
Adults reach a length of about 5 mm (0.20 in). They have a short-oval, shiny, glabrous, blackish-brown body.
