= Agrilinus wassuensis =

Scientific classification
- Kingdom: Animalia
- Phylum: Arthropoda
- Clade: Pancrustacea
- Class: Insecta
- Order: Coleoptera
- Suborder: Polyphaga
- Infraorder: Scarabaeiformia
- Family: Scarabaeidae
- Genus: Agrilinus
- Species: A. wassuensis

Binomial name
- Agrilinus wassuensis (Petrovitz, 1962)

Synonyms
- Aphodius (Agrilinus) wassuensis Petrovitz, 1962

Species of beetle

Agrilinus wassuensis is a species of beetle of the family Scarabaeidae. It is found in China (Sichuan).

== Description ==
Adults reach a length of about 3.8–4.2 mm (0.15–0.17 in). They have a short, convex, dull, glabrous, black body, with the margin of the clypeus, the anterior angles of the pronotum and the tips of the elytra faintly reddish. The legs are pitch-brown.
