= Auleutes tenuipes =

Scientific classification
- Kingdom: Animalia
- Phylum: Arthropoda
- Class: Insecta
- Order: Coleoptera
- Suborder: Polyphaga
- Infraorder: Cucujiformia
- Family: Curculionidae
- Genus: Auleutes
- Species: A. tenuipes

Binomial name
- Auleutes tenuipes (LeConte, 1876)

Species of beetle

Auleutes tenuipes is a species of minute seed weevil in the family Curculionidae. It is found in North America.
