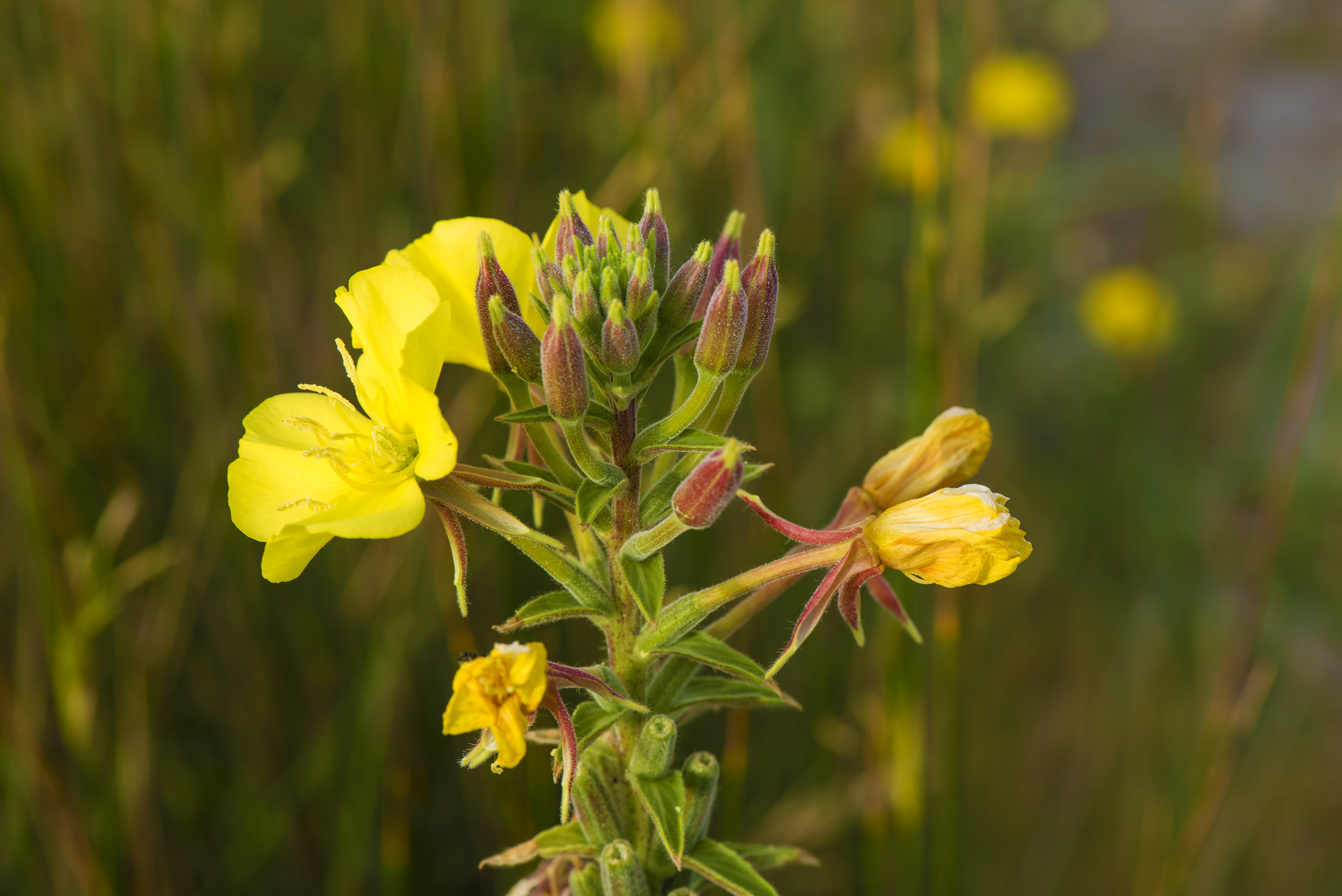

Scientific classification
- Kingdom: Plantae
- Clade: Embryophytes
- Clade: Tracheophytes
- Clade: Spermatophytes
- Clade: Angiosperms
- Clade: Eudicots
- Clade: Rosids
- Order: Myrtales
- Family: Onagraceae
- Genus: Oenothera
- Species: O. biennis

Binomial name
- Oenothera biennis L.

Synonyms
- Brunyera biennis (L.) Bubani; Oenothera biennis var. vulgaris Torr. & A.Gray; Onagra biennis (L.) Scop.; Pseudo-oenothera virginiana Rupr.

= Oenothera biennis =

Plant species in the evening-primrose family

Oenothera biennis, the common evening-primrose, is a species of flowering plant in the family Onagraceae, native to eastern and central North America, from Newfoundland west to Alberta, southeast to Florida, and southwest to Texas, and widely naturalized elsewhere in temperate and subtropical regions. Evening primrose oil is produced from the plant.

== Common names ==
The plant is known by various common names, such as evening star, sundrop, German rampion, hog weed, and fever-plant.

== Description ==
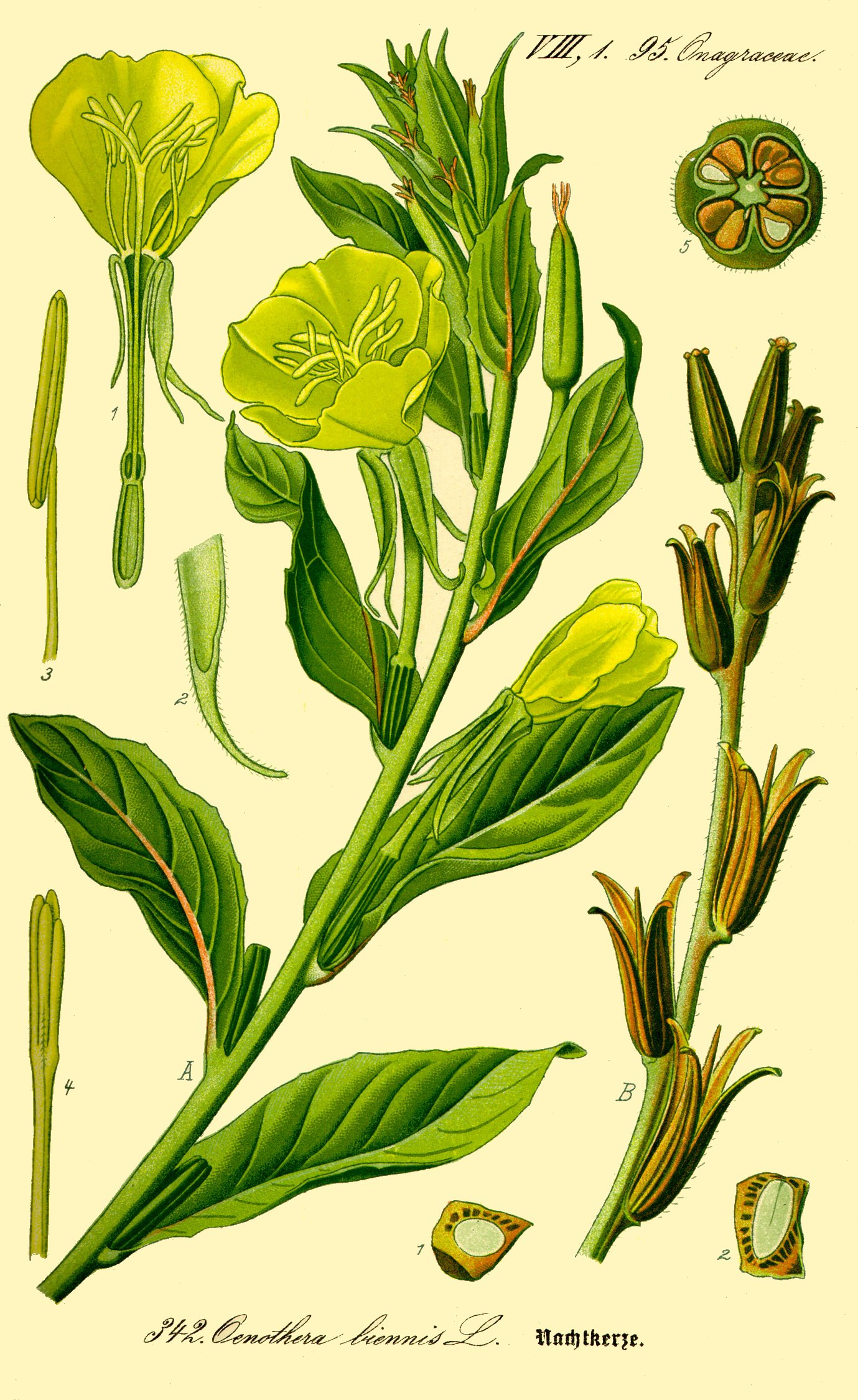
Illustration of Oenothera biennis

Oenothera biennis usually has a life span of two years (biennial) growing to 1.6 m (5 ft 3 in) tall in the seeding year. The leaves are lanceolate, 8–18 cm (3–7 in) long and 2–6 cm (3/4–2 1/4 in) wide, produced in a tight rosette the first year, and spirally on a stem the second year. However, plants with annual life cycles are documented, and have been selected for under experimental conditions in environments with low competition.

=== Growing cycle ===
Most commonly, O. biennis grows as a low, spreading herb in the first year, just a few centimetres tall, with its leaves spreading out in a rosette to cover the ground, whilst storing energy in a thick root. In the second year, it grows up much taller, to around 1.6 metres (5.2 ft) tall, on a semi-woody stem, which then flowers and seeds. This will usually die at first frosts, but occasionally grows another stem in the third year.

=== Blooming and fruiting ===
Blooming lasts from late spring to late summer. The flowers are hermaphrodite, produced on a tall spike and only last until the following noon. They open visibly fast every evening producing an interesting spectacle, hence the name "evening primrose".

The blooms are yellow, 2.5–5 cm (1–2 in) diameter, with four bilobed petals. The flower structure has a bright nectar guide pattern, invisible to the naked eye. This pattern is apparent under ultraviolet light and visible to its pollinators, moths, butterflies, and bees.

The fruit is a capsule 2–4 cm (3/4–1 1/2 in) long and 4–6 mm (0.16–0.24 in) broad, containing numerous 1–2 mm (0.04–0.08 in) long seeds, released when the capsule splits into four sections at maturity.

Floral diagram.

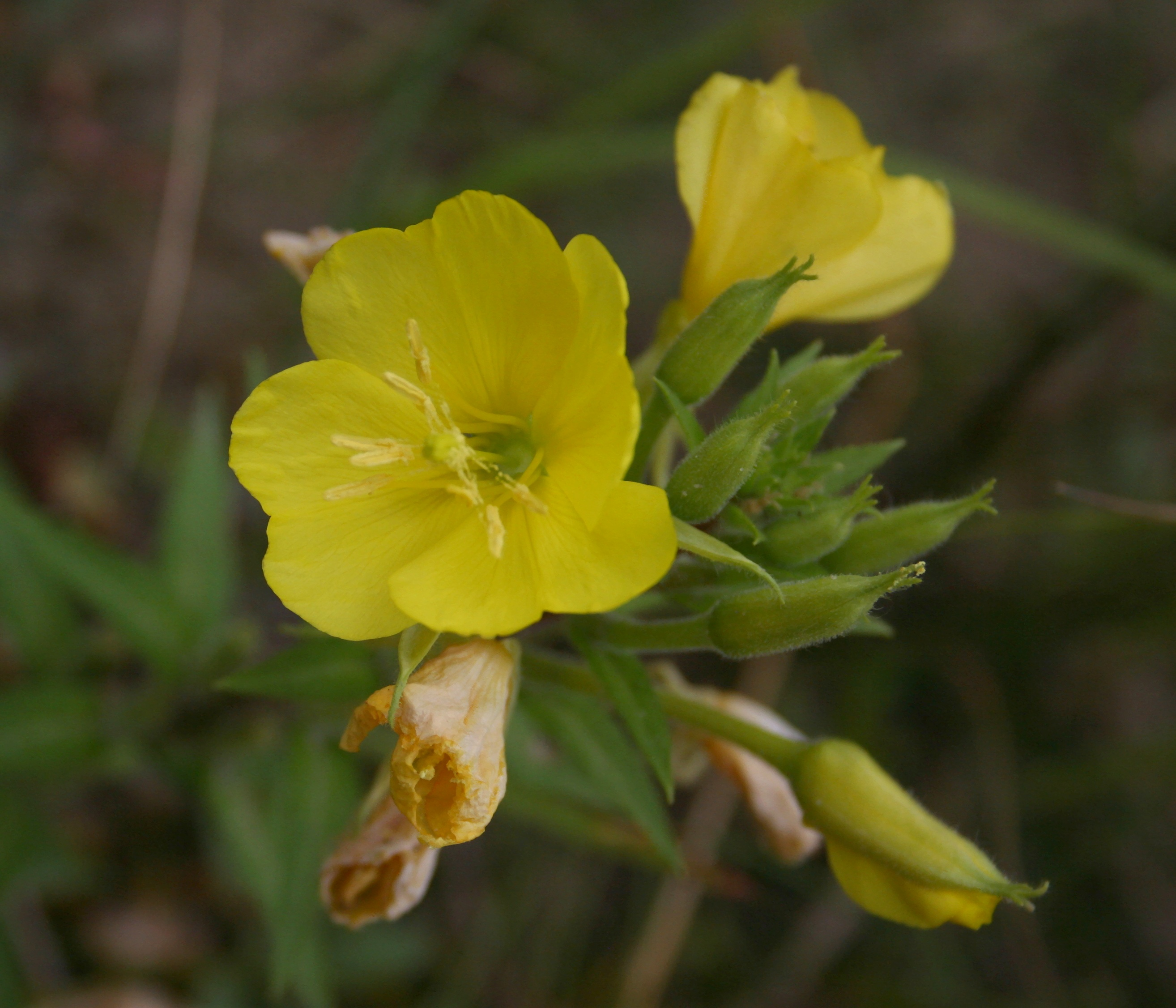
Open flower in the evening

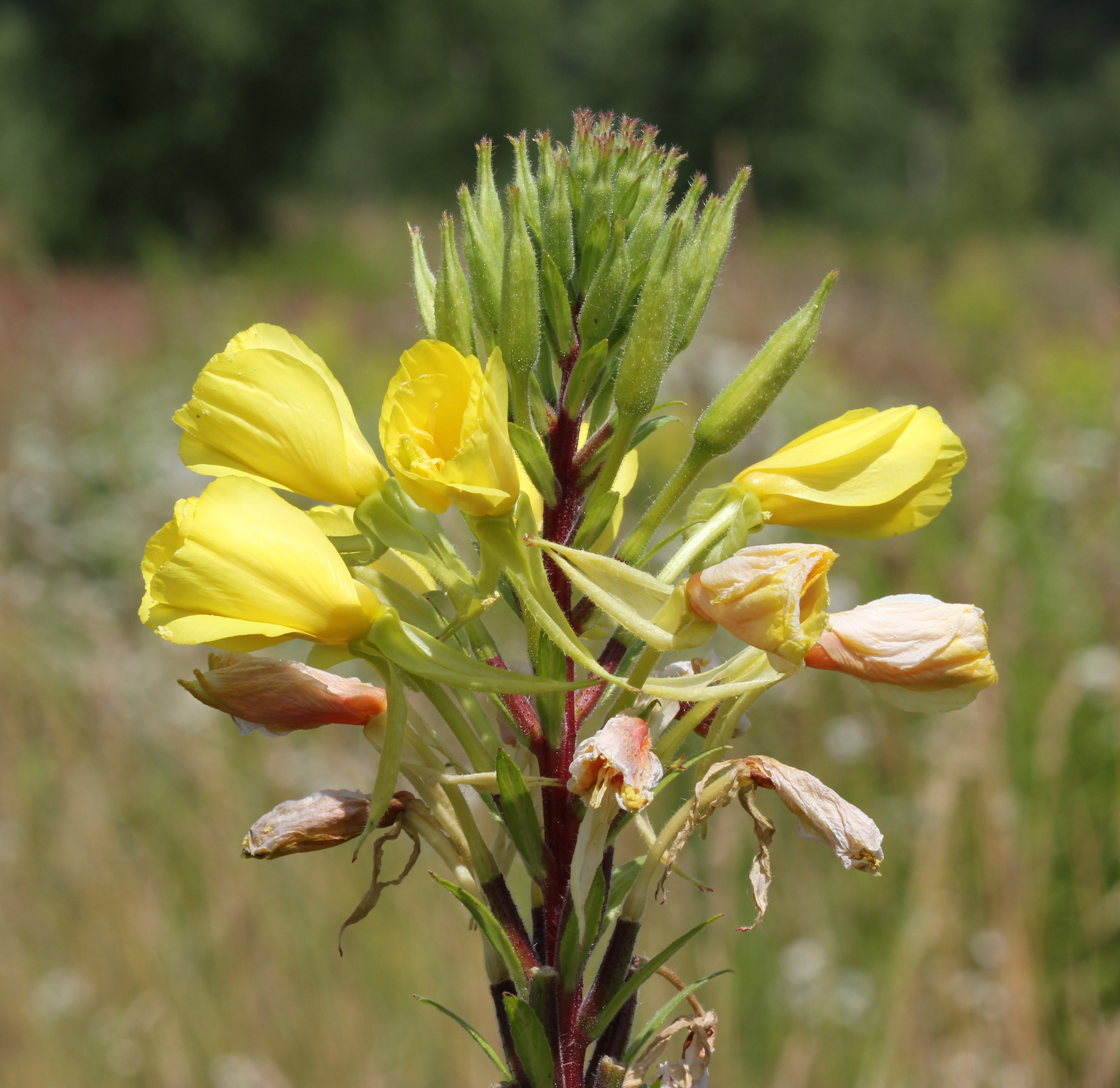
Closed flowers in the morning

== Taxonomy ==
Oenothera biennis was given its scientific name in 1753 by Carl Linnaeus in the book Species Plantarum. It has no accepted subspecies or varieties, but it has 127 synonyms according to Plants of the World Online.

Table of Synonyms
Name	Year	Rank	Notes
Brunyera biennis (L.) Bubani	1899	species	≡ hom.
Oenothera beckeri Renner	1942	species	= het., without a Latin descr.
Oenothera biennis var. alba Alef.	1866	variety	= het.
Oenothera biennis var. angustifolia Renner	1956	variety	= het.
Oenothera biennis subsp. biennis Thell.	1912	subspecies	= het., not validly publ.
Oenothera biennis subsp. caeciarum Munz	1965	subspecies	= het.
Oenothera biennis var. cantabrigiana B.M.Davis	1957	variety	= het.
Oenothera biennis subsp. centralis Munz	1965	subspecies	= het.
Oenothera biennis subsp. chicaginensis (de Vries ex Renner & Cleland) Á.Löve & D.Löve	1961	subspecies	= het.
Oenothera biennis subsp. grandiflora Stomps	1948	subspecies	= het., nom. superfl.
Oenothera biennis subf. latifolia (Asch.) Thell.	1912	subform	= het.
Oenothera biennis f. leptomeres (Bartlett) P.D.Sell	2009	form	= het.
Oenothera biennis var. leptomeres Bartlett	1914	variety	= het.
Oenothera biennis var. lutea Alef.	1866	variety	= het.
Oenothera biennis f. muricata (L.) H.Lév. ex Thell.	1912	form	= het.
Oenothera biennis var. muricata (L.) Torr. & A.Gray	1840	variety	= het.
Oenothera biennis f. nanella de Vries	1913	form	= het.
Oenothera biennis var. parviflora Abrom.	1898	variety	= het., nom. illeg.
Oenothera biennis var. pycnocarpa (G.F.Atk. & Bartlett) Wiegand	1924	variety	= het.
Oenothera biennis subsp. rubricaulis (Kleb.) Stomps	1948	subspecies	= het., nom. illeg.
Oenothera biennis var. rubricaulis (Farw.) Farw.	1923	variety	= het.
Oenothera biennis subsp. suaveolens (Pers.) Rouy & E.G.Camus	1901	subspecies	= het.
Oenothera biennis var. sulphurea de Vries ex Bartlett	1913	variety	= het.
Oenothera biennis var. vulgaris Torr. & A.Gray	1840	variety	≡ hom., not validly publ.
Oenothera brevicapsula Bartlett	1914	species	= het.
Oenothera brevispicata Hudziok	1968	species	= het.
Oenothera cambrica Rostański	1977	species	= het.
Oenothera cambrica var. impunctata Rostański	1977	variety	= het.
Oenothera carinthiaca Rostański	1977	species	= het.
Oenothera casimiri Rostański	2004	species	= het.
Oenothera chicaginensis de Vries ex Renner & Cleland	1933	species	= het.
Oenothera chicaginensis var. bartlettii Soldano	1992	variety	= het.
Oenothera chicaginensis var. minutiflora Rostański & V.Jehlik	1979	variety	= het.
Oenothera chicaginensis var. parviflora Renner	1956	variety	= het.
Oenothera chicagoensis Renner ex R.E.Cleland & Blakeslee	1930	species	= het.
Oenothera communis H.Lév.	1909	species	= het., nom. superfl.
Oenothera communis proles biennis (L.) H.Lév.	1910	proles	≡ hom.
Oenothera communis f. canescens H.Lév.	1909	form	= het.
Oenothera communis f. suaveolens (Pers.) H.Lév.	1909	form	= het.
Oenothera compacta Hudziok	1968	species	= het.
Oenothera editicaulis Hudziok	1968	species	= het.
Oenothera ersteinensis H.P.Linder & Jean	1970	species	= het.
Oenothera flaemingina Hudziok	1968	species	= het.
Oenothera furca Boedijn	1924	species	= het.
Oenothera gauroides Hornem.	1813	species	= het.
Oenothera gauroides var. brevicapsula (Bartlett) R.R.Gates	1957	variety	= het.
Oenothera glabra Mill.	1768	species	= het.
Oenothera grandiflora var. tracyi (Bartlett) R.R.Gates	1957	variety	= het.
Oenothera grandifolia R.R.Gates	1936	species	= het.
Oenothera graveolens Gilib.	1782	species	= het., opus utique oppr.
Oenothera hirtella de Vries	1903	species	= het., nom. illeg.
Oenothera inconspecta Hudziok	1968	species	= het.
Oenothera indivisa Hudziok	1968	species	= het.
Oenothera jueterbogensis Hudziok	1968	species	= het.
Oenothera jueterbogensis var. macrosperma Hudziok	1964	variety	= het.
Oenothera latipetala (Soldano) Soldano	2010	species	= het.
Oenothera macrosperma (Hudziok) Hudziok	1965	species	= het.
Oenothera marinellae Soldano	1982	species	= het.
Oenothera media Link	1821	species	= het.
Oenothera mediomarchica Hudziok	1968	species	= het.
Oenothera muricata L.	1767	species	= het., nom. utique rej. prop.
Oenothera muricata var. latifolia Asch.	1860	variety	= het.
Oenothera muricata var. rhodoneura Renner	1937	variety	= het.
Oenothera muricata var. rubricaulis Farw.	1923	variety	= het.
Oenothera nissensis Rostański	1965	species	= het.
Oenothera nissensis var. fiedleri Gutte & Rostański	1981	variety	= het.
Oenothera novae-scotiae var. serratifolia R.R.Gates	1936	variety	= het.
Oenothera nuda Renner ex Rostański	2009	species	= het.
Oenothera numismatica Bartlett	1914	species	= het.
Oenothera obscurifolia Hudziok	1968	species	= het.
Oenothera octolineata Hudziok	1968	species	= het.
Oenothera paradoxa Hudziok	1968	species	= het.
Oenothera paralamarckiana R.R.Gates	1936	species	= het.
Oenothera parviflora var. muricata (L.) Farw.	1923	variety	= het.
Oenothera pedemontana Soldano	1983	species	= het.
Oenothera pellegrinii Soldano	1982	species	= het.
Oenothera pratincola Bartlett	1914	species	= het.
Oenothera pratincola var. numismatica (Bartlett) R.R.Gates	1957	variety	= het.
Oenothera pratincola f. typica Bartlett	1915	form	= het., not validly publ.
Oenothera pubescens Nees	1841	species	= het., nom. illeg.
Oenothera punctulata Rostański & Gutte	1971	species	= het.
Oenothera purpurata Kleb.	1925	species	= het.
Oenothera pycnocarpa G.F.Atk. & Bartlett	1913	species	= het.
Oenothera pycnocarpa var. cleistogama R.R.Gates	1936	variety	= het.
Oenothera pycnocarpa var. parviflora R.R.Gates	1936	variety	= het.
Oenothera pyramidiflora Hudziok	1968	species	= het.
Oenothera reynoldsii Bartlett	1914	species	= het.
Oenothera reynoldsii f. semialta Bartlett	1915	form	= het.
Oenothera reynoldsii f. typica Bartlett	1915	form	= het., not validly publ.
Oenothera rostanskii V.Jehlík	1985	species	= het.
Oenothera royfraseri R.R.Gates	1936	species	= het.
Oenothera rubiella de Vries	1903	species	= het.
Oenothera rubiennis de Vries	1903	species	= het.
Oenothera rubricaulis Kleb.	1913	species	= het.
Oenothera rubricaulis var. dentifolia V.Jehlík & Rostański	1979	variety	= het.
Oenothera rubricaulis var. longistylis Gutte & Rostański	1981	variety	= het.
Oenothera rubricauloides Rostański	2007	species	= het.
Oenothera ruderalis Bartlett	1914	species	= het.
Oenothera sabulosa Farw.	1930	species	= het.
Oenothera sackvillensis R.R.Gates	1936	species	= het.
Oenothera sackvillensis var. albiviridis R.R.Gates	1936	variety	= het.
Oenothera sackvillensis var. royfraseri (R.R.Gates) R.R.Gates	1957	variety	= het.
Oenothera salicastrum de Vries	1913	species	= het.
Oenothera sesitensis Soldano	1978	species	= het.
Oenothera shulliana A.H.Sturtev.	1931	species	= het.
Oenothera stenomeres Bartlett	1914	species	= het.
Oenothera stenomeres f. typica Bartlett	1915	form	= het., not validly publ.
Oenothera stucchii Soldano	1978	species	= het.
Oenothera suaveolens Pers.	1804	species	= het.
Oenothera suaveolens var. latipetala Soldano	1981	variety	= het.
Oenothera tacikii Rostański	1965	species	= het.
Oenothera tracyi Bartlett	1911	species	= het.
Oenothera turoviensis Rostański	1965	species	= het.
Oenothera victorinii R.R.Gates & Catches.	1933	species	= het.
Oenothera victorinii var. intermedia R.R.Gates	1936	variety	= het.
Oenothera victorinii var. parviflora R.R.Gates	1936	variety	= het.
Oenothera victorinii f. rostanskii (V.Jehlík) V.Jehlík & Rostański	1995	form	= het.
Oenothera victorinii var. undulata R.R.Gates	1936	variety	= het.
Oenothera wratislaviensis Rostański	2007	species	= het.
Onagra biennis (L.) Scop.	1771	species	≡ hom.
Onagra chrysantha var. latifolia Spach	1835	variety	= het.
Onagra europaea Spach	1835	species	= het.
Onagra media (Link) Spach	1835	species	= het.
Onagra muricata (L.) Moench	1794	species	= het.
Onagra vulgaris Spach	1835	species	= het.
Onosuris acuminata Raf.	1817	species	= het.
Pseudo-oenothera virginiana Rupr.	1860	species	≡ hom., nom. superfl.
Notes: ≡ homotypic synonym; = heterotypic synonym

== Ecology ==
This plant is a weedy species that favors disturbed environments. It has been introduced and become established on all continents except Antarctica.

The seeds of the plant are important food for birds, including American goldfinch, Northern bobwhite, and mourning dove, and it is a larval host for both the primrose moth and the white-lined sphinx moth. Bumblebees and honeybees also visit the flowers.

The primrose moth (Schinia florida) is a common consumer of Oenothera biennis. The adults lay eggs on the flower, and the emerging caterpillars feed on the plant.

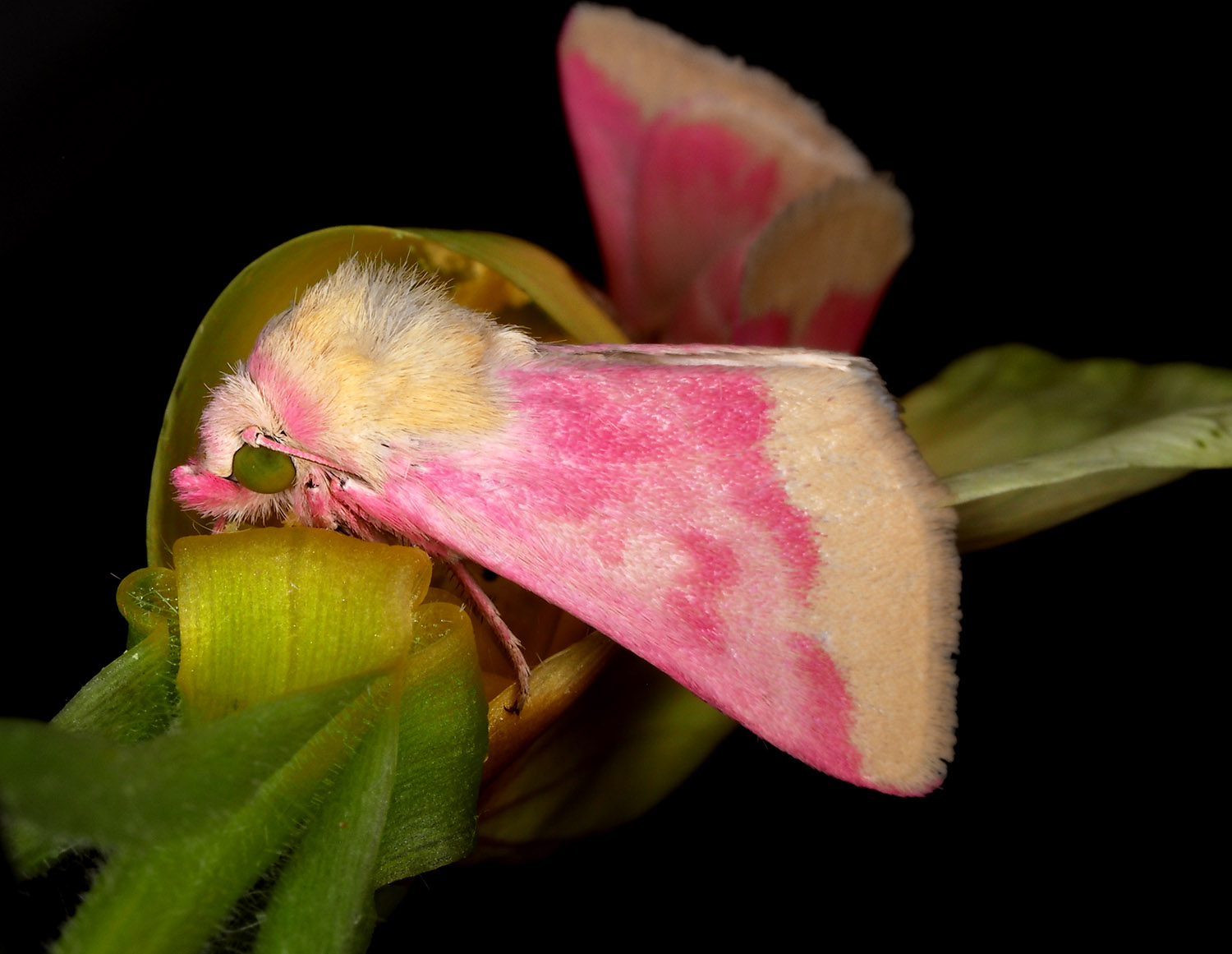
Primrose moth, Schinia florida, on an evening primrose; petals have been removed to reveal the insect

The seeds of O. biennis can remain viable in the soil seed bank for 70 years or more.

== Uses ==
Over the centuries, Indigenous people in North America have used the plant as food and traditional medicine.

The evening primrose was introduced to Europe in the early 17th century as an ornamental plant in botanical gardens where its flowers are favored for nectar by pollinators, such as bees, and its seeds are food for birds.

=== Food uses ===
Most of the plant parts are edible, having a taste that is mild. The roots can be eaten raw or cooked like potatoes. The leaves can be eaten raw in salads or cooked like spinach or in soups. Anishinaabe tribes traditionally make tea from the evening primrose leaves for use as a dietary aid and to reduce fatigue.

The flowering stems are preferably used when they are still young in June. They have to be peeled and can then be eaten raw or fried. The flower buds are regarded as a delicacy and can be harvested from June to October.

The seeds have a protein content of about 15%, an oil content of 24%, and contain about 43% cellulose. The proteins are especially rich in the sulphur-containing amino acids, methionine and cysteine, and tryptophan. Gamma-linolenic acid (GLA), and linoleic acid are present. Mainly for these polyunsaturated fatty acids, evening primrose oil is sold as a dietary supplement.

=== Research ===
There is not enough clinical evidence to support the use of evening primrose oil as a therapy for any medical condition. A Cochrane review concluded that there was no effect of primrose oil on eczema. The Mayo Clinic stated there was no good evidence that it affected eczema, diabetic neuropathy or premenstrual syndrome.

The American Cancer Society stated that there was little evidence for its effectiveness as an anti-cancer agent, for which it is sometimes promoted, and "neither GLA nor other GLA-rich supplements (such as evening primrose oil) have been convincingly shown to be useful in preventing or treating any other health conditions."

==== Adverse effects ====
Evening primrose oil is considered likely as safe in recommended doses. It may increase the risk of bleeding, a concern for patients with bleeding disorders or taking drugs that may increase bleeding. The Mayo Clinic recommends caution in people with seizure disorders or mania, and by pregnant or breastfeeding women, and publishes a long list of possible side-effects. Oral use of evening primrose oil may cause headaches or nausea.

==== Traditional medicine ====
The leaves and stems were used by Native Americans to treat skin, digestion, and throat conditions.

== Agricultural practices ==
The knowledge of agricultural practices in the cultivation of evening primrose is relatively new and only pertain to the commercialized production of evening primrose seed oil. Information of agricultural practices for the production of root vegetable or other plant parts is not known yet.

The evening primrose prefers sunny and arid places with loamy soil and occurs below 700 metres (2,300 ft) above sea level. One important prerequisite is to meet adequate nitrogen requirements. While too high nitrogen levels could lead to a quality and quantity decline of the oil content in the seeds, moderate nitrogen levels lead to increased seed quality and quantity. Because the evening primrose is a light-dependent germinator, it is important that the seeds are not planted too deep into the soil, about 0.5–1.0 centimetre (0.2–0.4 in) deep. The cultivation of evening primrose is thus suitable for no-till farming, but the plants require an intense mechanical weed control. The seeds are tiny, about 0.3–0.7 grams (0.011–0.025 oz). They need approximately two to three weeks to germinate and are therefore very susceptible to the outgrowth of weeds.

Evening primrose seeds can be sown in the first half of April (spring seeds) or from mid-July to mid-August (autumn seeds). The time of harvest is approximately 75 to 80 days (spring seeds) or 100 days (autumn seeds) after flowering, and clearly influenced by the plant variety, climate conditions, soil fertility and sowing time. The population development and thus seed maturation of the evening primrose is very heterogeneous which is a rather difficult production factor.

There is not much water needed during the vegetation period. A study has shown, that the irrigation with salt water could increase the oil yield and quality in evening primrose seeds. This might be a great opportunity especially in regions with limited water resources. Thus, the evening primrose could be a valuable alternative oil crop in arid regions.

Finally, the cultivation of evening primrose requires a proper field management otherwise the plant can become invasive. If the seeds are used for pharmaceutical purposes it is also important to grow the evening primrose without any pesticides to avoid any chemical residues.

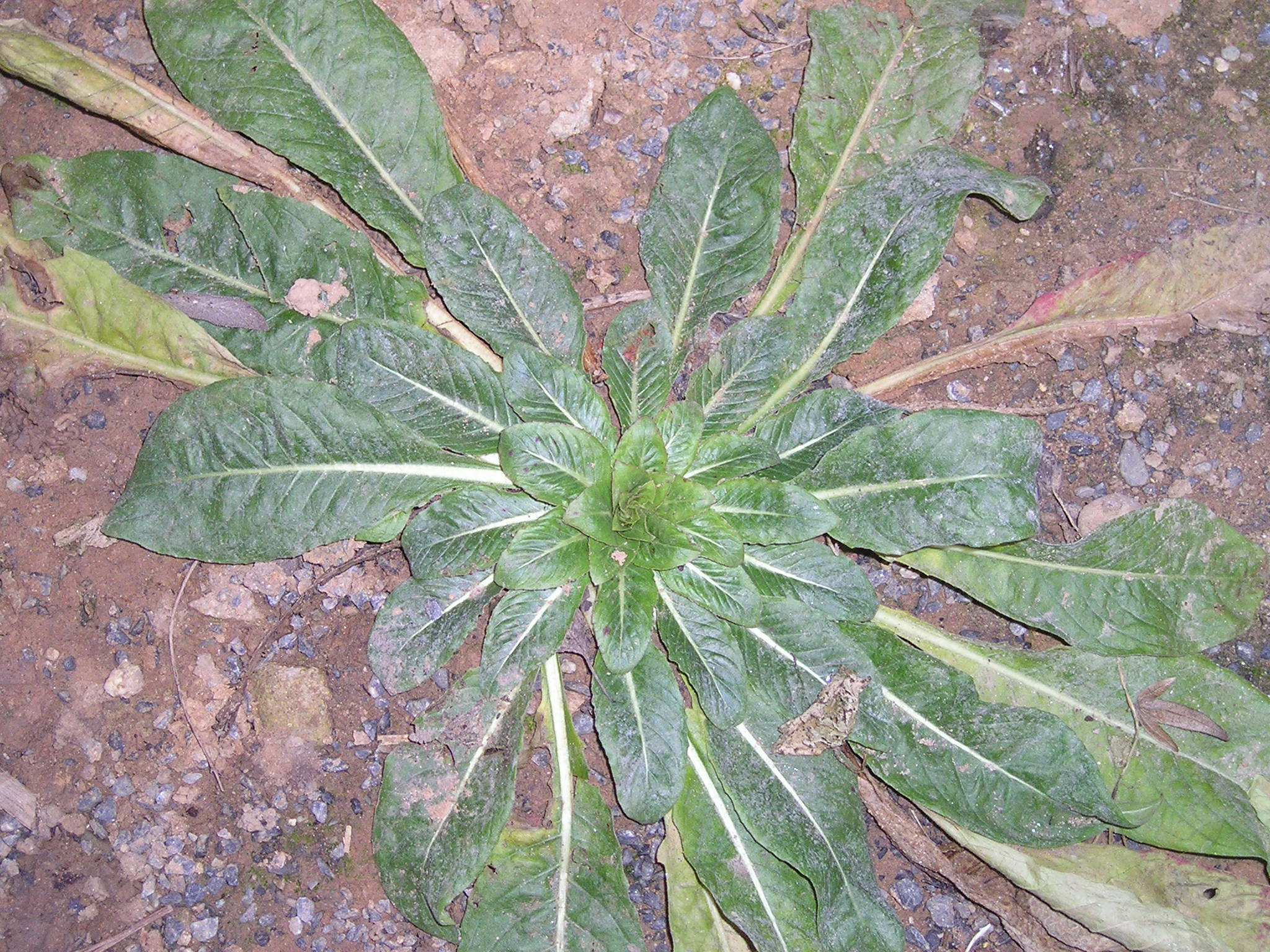
Rosette

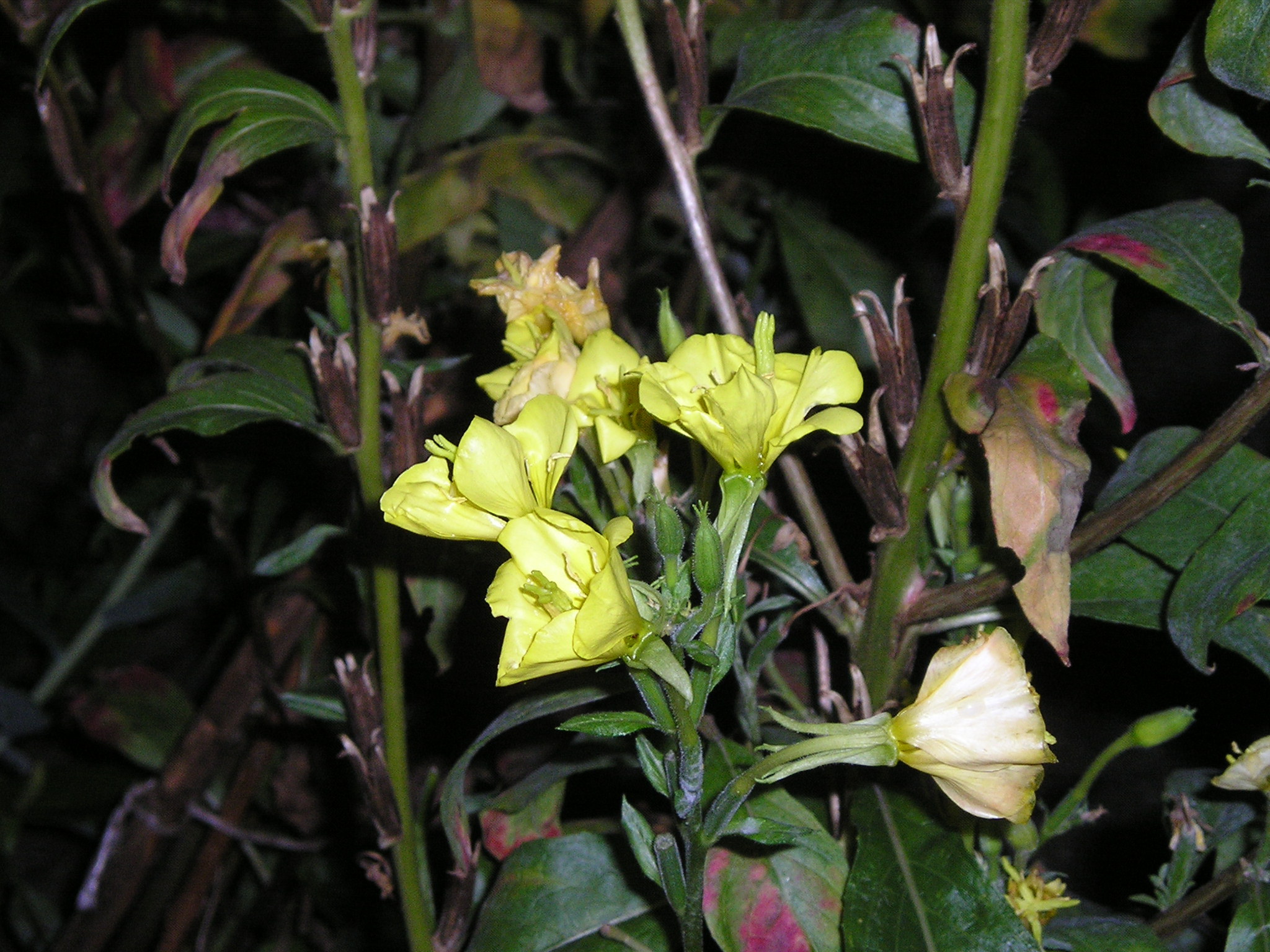
Flowers and fruit capsules

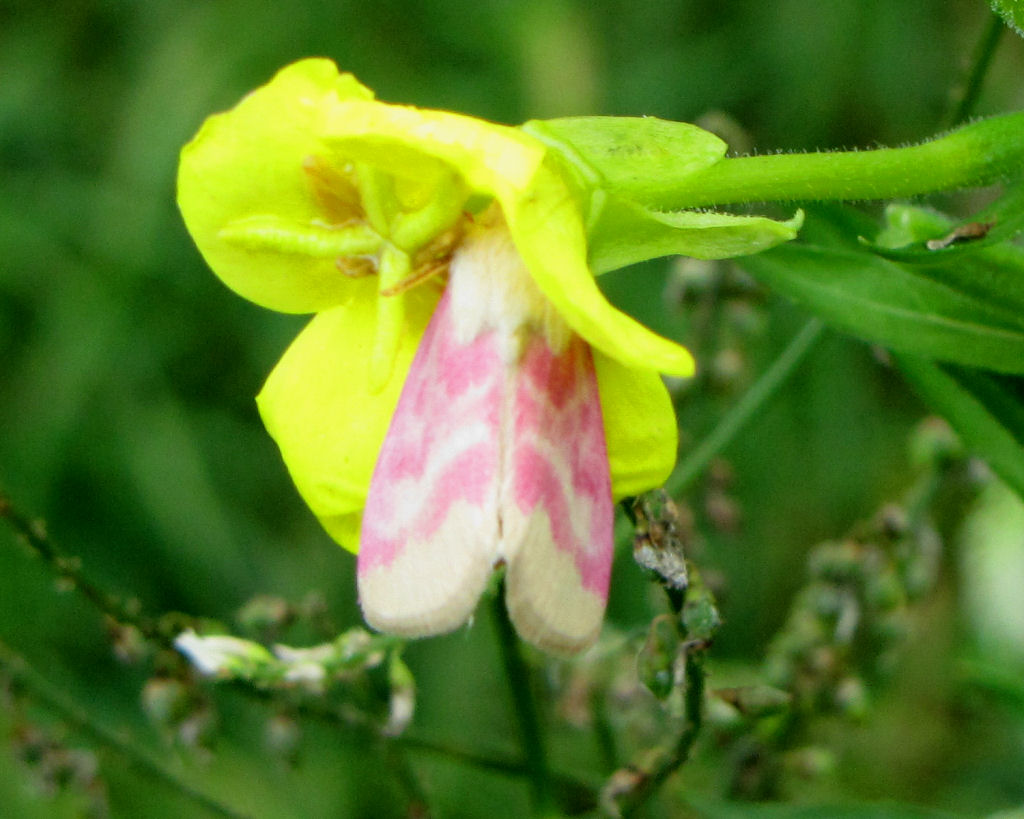
Primrose moth (Schinia florida) in flower

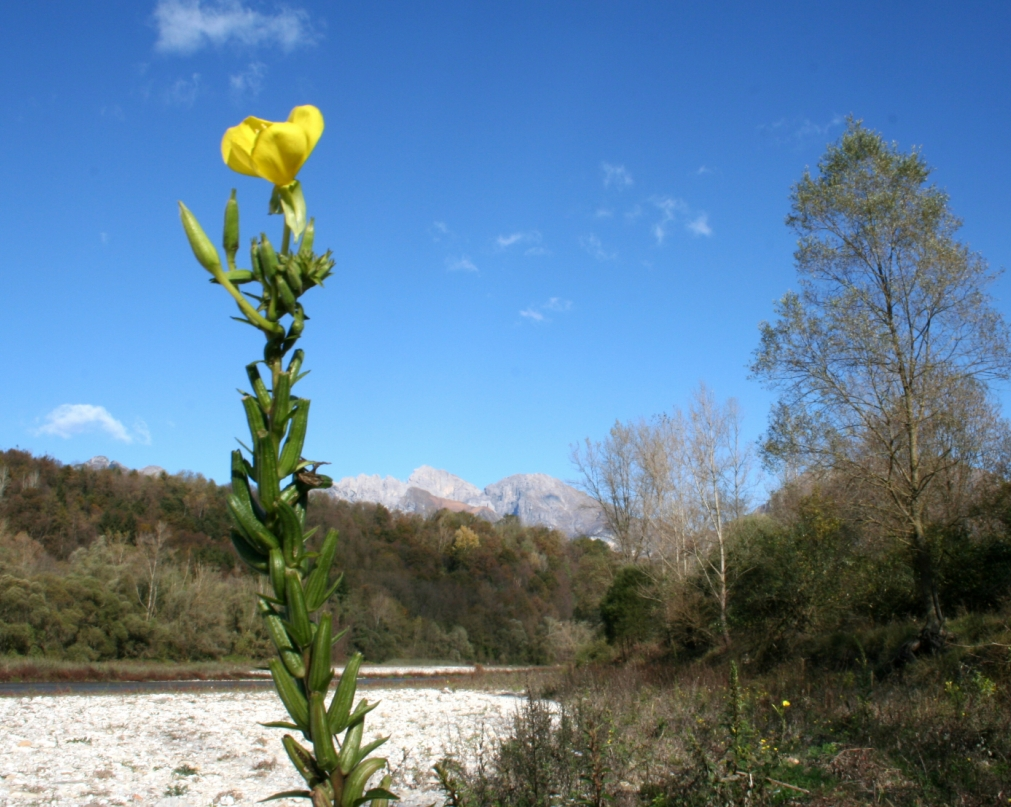
Habitat, dry and sunny
