= Agrilinus convexus =

Scientific classification
- Kingdom: Animalia
- Phylum: Arthropoda
- Clade: Pancrustacea
- Class: Insecta
- Order: Coleoptera
- Suborder: Polyphaga
- Infraorder: Scarabaeiformia
- Family: Scarabaeidae
- Genus: Agrilinus
- Species: A. convexus

Binomial name
- Agrilinus convexus (Erichson, 1848)

Synonyms
- Aphodius convexus Erichson, 1848; Aphodius emerichi Reitter, 1892; Aphodius ascendens Reiche, 1863; Aphodius lucasii Harold, 1859; Aphodius affinis Lucas, 1846

Species of beetle

Agrilinus convexus is a species of beetle of the family Scarabaeidae. It is found in Albania, Algeria, Armenia, Austria, Azerbaijan, Bosnia Herzegovina, Bulgaria, Croatia, the Czech Republic, France, Georgia, Germany, Greece, Hungary, Iran, Italy (Sicily), Montenegro, Morocco, Poland, Romania, Russia (including the Russian Far East and Siberia), Serbia, Slovakia, Slovenia, Spain, Switzerland, Tunisia and Turkey.

== Description ==
Adults reach a length of about 3.7–5.6 mm (0.15–0.22 in). They have a strongly convex, subparallel, black body, sometimes with the elytra reddish-brown. The forebody is shiny and the elytra and scutellum are usually also shiny.
