= Agrilinus striatus =

Scientific classification
- Kingdom: Animalia
- Phylum: Arthropoda
- Clade: Pancrustacea
- Class: Insecta
- Order: Coleoptera
- Suborder: Polyphaga
- Infraorder: Scarabaeiformia
- Family: Scarabaeidae
- Genus: Agrilinus
- Species: A. striatus

Binomial name
- Agrilinus striatus (Schmidt, 1910)

Synonyms
- Aphodius striatus Schmidt, 1910

Species of beetle

Agrilinus striatus is a species of beetle of the family Scarabaeidae. It is found in China (Liaoning, Yunnan, Zhejiang).

== Description ==
Adults reach a length of about 5.5–6.5 mm (0.22–0.26 in). They have an fairly broadly oval, strongly convex, glossy, glabrous, reddish-brown body.
