= Cnemogonus =

Scientific classification
- Kingdom: Animalia
- Phylum: Arthropoda
- Class: Insecta
- Order: Coleoptera
- Suborder: Polyphaga
- Infraorder: Cucujiformia
- Family: Curculionidae
- Tribe: Cnemogonini
- Genus: Cnemogonus; LeConte, 1876

Genus of beetles

Cnemogonus is a genus of minute seed weevils in the beetle family Curculionidae. There are about five described species in Cnemogonus.

== Species ==
These five species belong to the genus Cnemogonus:

- Cnemogonus carinirostris Hustache, 1922
- Cnemogonus cristulatus Hustache, 1922
- Cnemogonus epilobii Bedel, 1887
- Cnemogonus ferrugineus Hustache, 1922
- Cnemogonus lecontei Dietz, 1896
