= Agrilinus lindbergi =

Scientific classification
- Kingdom: Animalia
- Phylum: Arthropoda
- Clade: Pancrustacea
- Class: Insecta
- Order: Coleoptera
- Suborder: Polyphaga
- Infraorder: Scarabaeiformia
- Family: Scarabaeidae
- Genus: Agrilinus
- Species: A. lindbergi

Binomial name
- Agrilinus lindbergi (Petrovitz, 1959)

Synonyms
- Aphodius (Agrilinus) lindbergi Petrovitz, 1959

Species of beetle

Agrilinus lindbergi is a species of beetle of the family Scarabaeidae. It is found in Afghanistan.

== Description ==
Adults reach a length of about 4.8–5.8 mm (0.19–0.23 in). They have a slightly convex, glossy, glabrous, dark brown to blackish-brown body, with the sides of the pronotum usually translucent and lighter, while the sides and apex of the elytra are often lighter brown. the legs are dark reddish-brown.
