= Agrilinus uniformis =

Scientific classification
- Kingdom: Animalia
- Phylum: Arthropoda
- Clade: Pancrustacea
- Class: Insecta
- Order: Coleoptera
- Suborder: Polyphaga
- Infraorder: Scarabaeiformia
- Family: Scarabaeidae
- Genus: Agrilinus
- Species: A. uniformis

Binomial name
- Agrilinus uniformis (Waterhouse, 1875)

Synonyms
- Aphodius uniformis Waterhouse, 1875; Aphodius (Agrilinus) hayachinensis Nomura & Nakane, 1951; Aphodius (Agrilinus) maritimus Nomura & Nakane, 1951; Aphodius (Agrilinus) etorofuensis Kôno, 1937

Species of beetle

Agrilinus uniformis is a species of beetle of the family Scarabaeidae. It is found in Japan, Korea and the Russian Far East.

== Description ==
Adults reach a length of about 3.5–5 mm (0.14–0.20 in). They have an elongate, convex, shining, glabrous, black to brownish-black body, with only the dull apical area of the elytra reddish-brown.

== Life history ==
Specimens have been collected from cow, horse, sheep and human dung.
