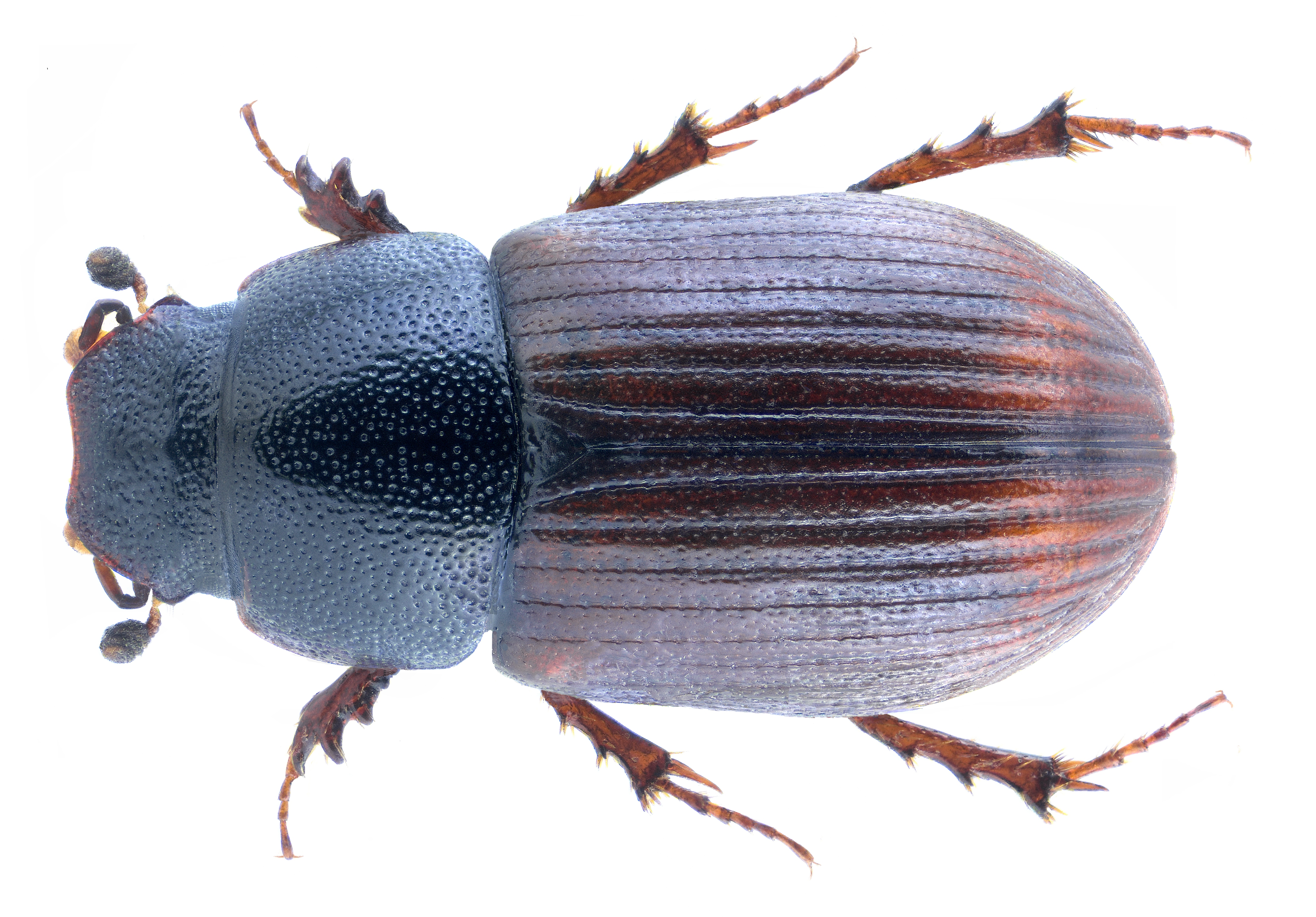

Scientific classification
- Kingdom: Animalia
- Phylum: Arthropoda
- Clade: Pancrustacea
- Class: Insecta
- Order: Coleoptera
- Suborder: Polyphaga
- Infraorder: Scarabaeiformia
- Family: Scarabaeidae
- Genus: Agrilinus
- Species: A. ibericus

Binomial name
- Agrilinus ibericus (Harold, 1874)

Synonyms
- Aphodius ibericus Harold, 1874; Aphodius (Agrilinus) scheuerni Ádám, 1979; Aphodius (Pseudolimarus) jugurtha Balthasar, 1931; Aphodius (Calamosternus) basilicatus Fiori, 1907

= Agrilinus ibericus =

Species of beetle

Agrilinus ibericus is a species of beetle of the family Scarabaeidae. It is found in Italy, Algeria, Greece, Morocco, Portugal, Spain, Tunisia and Turkey.

== Description ==
Adults reach a length of about 4–5 mm (0.16–0.20 in). They have an elongate-oval, quite strongly convex, glossy, glabrous body. The forebody and underside are black, with the sides of the pronotum reddish and translucent. The elytra are dark reddish-brown with a blackened sutural margin. The apical area is lighter reddish-brown.

== Subspecies ==
- Agrilinus ibericus basilicatus (Fiori, 1907) (Italy: Basilicata, Sicily)
- Agrilinus ibericus ibericus (Algeria, Greece, Morocco, Portugal, Spain, Tunisia, Turkey)
