= Agrilinus madara =

Scientific classification
- Kingdom: Animalia
- Phylum: Arthropoda
- Clade: Pancrustacea
- Class: Insecta
- Order: Coleoptera
- Suborder: Polyphaga
- Infraorder: Scarabaeiformia
- Family: Scarabaeidae
- Genus: Agrilinus
- Species: A. madara

Binomial name
- Agrilinus madara (Nakane, 1960)

Synonyms
- Aphodius (Acrossus) hasegawai madara Nakane, 1960

Species of beetle

Agrilinus madara is a species of beetle of the family Scarabaeidae. It is found in Japan.

== Description ==
Adults reach a length of about 3.5–4 mm (0.14–0.16 in). They have a black body, with the margin of head and the sides of the pronotum and the elytra reddish-brown. The elytra have a number of black patches.
