= Agrilinus pirinensis =

Scientific classification
- Kingdom: Animalia
- Phylum: Arthropoda
- Clade: Pancrustacea
- Class: Insecta
- Order: Coleoptera
- Suborder: Polyphaga
- Infraorder: Scarabaeiformia
- Family: Scarabaeidae
- Genus: Agrilinus
- Species: A. pirinensis

Binomial name
- Agrilinus pirinensis (Balthasar, 1946)

Synonyms
- Aphodius (Agrilinus) pirinensis Balthasar, 1946

Species of beetle

Agrilinus pirinensis is a species of beetle of the family Scarabaeidae. It is found in Bulgaria.

== Description ==
Adults reach a length of about 4.8 mm (0.19 in). They have a quite strongly convex, shiny, glabrous, black body. The pronotum has somewhat reddish sides, and the elytra have a reddish-brown apical area and lateral margins. The legs are brown.
