= Agrilinus obliviosus =

Scientific classification
- Kingdom: Animalia
- Phylum: Arthropoda
- Clade: Pancrustacea
- Class: Insecta
- Order: Coleoptera
- Suborder: Polyphaga
- Infraorder: Scarabaeiformia
- Family: Scarabaeidae
- Genus: Agrilinus
- Species: A. obliviosus

Binomial name
- Agrilinus obliviosus (Reitter, 1892)

Synonyms
- Aphodius (Agrilinus) obliviosus Reitter, 1892; Aphodius (Agrilinus) virginalis Reitter, 1900

Species of beetle

Agrilinus obliviosus is a species of beetle of the family Scarabaeidae. It is found in China (Qinghai, Nei Mongol, Xinjiang) and Mongolia.

== Description ==
Adults reach a length of about 5–5.5 mm (0.20–0.22 in). They have a fairly parallel-sided, strongly convex, glabrous, shining, black body. The elytra are reddish-brown, with the sutural interval darker brown.
