= Perigaster cretura =

Scientific classification
- Kingdom: Animalia
- Phylum: Arthropoda
- Class: Insecta
- Order: Coleoptera
- Suborder: Polyphaga
- Infraorder: Cucujiformia
- Family: Curculionidae
- Genus: Perigaster
- Species: P. cretura

Binomial name
- Perigaster cretura (Herbst, 1797)

Synonyms
- Falciger quadrispinosus Say, 1824

Species of beetle

Perigaster cretura is a species of minute seed weevil in the beetle family Curculionidae. It is found in North America.
