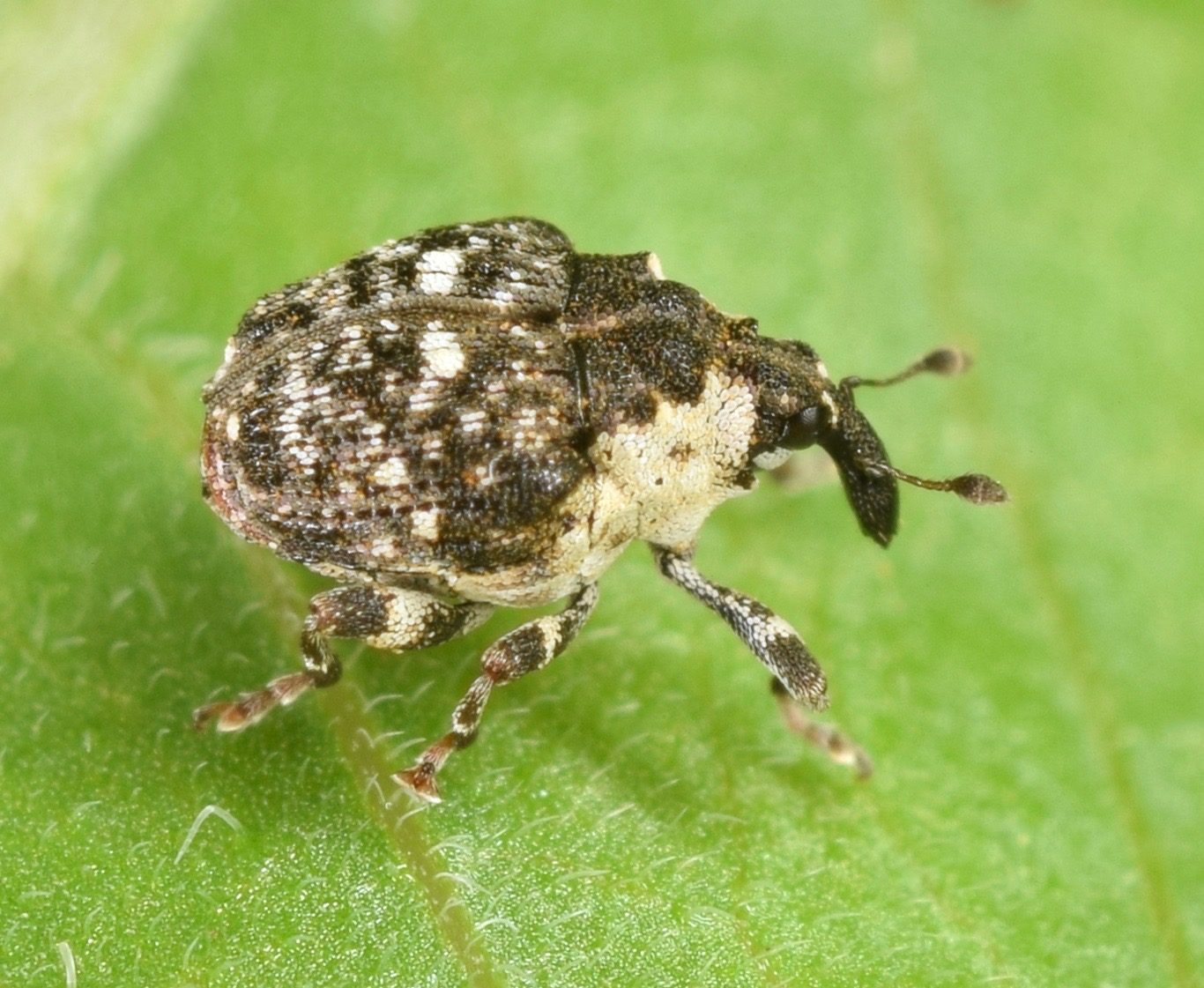
- Dietzella zimmermanni

Scientific classification
- Domain: Eukaryota
- Kingdom: Animalia
- Phylum: Arthropoda
- Class: Insecta
- Order: Coleoptera
- Suborder: Polyphaga
- Infraorder: Cucujiformia
- Family: Curculionidae
- Tribe: Cnemogonini
- Genus: Dietzella; Champion, 1907

Synonyms
- Coelogaster Schoenherr, 1837 (Preocc.); Caelogaster Dietz, 1896 (Lapsus)

= Dietzella =

Genus of beetles

Dietzella is a genus of minute seed weevils in the beetle family Curculionidae. There are two described species in Dietzella. It was previously referred to as Coelogaster, but that name was found to be preoccupied by an extinct chanid fish.

== Species ==
- Dietzella sextuberculata (Boheman, 1845)
- Dietzella zimmermanni (Gyllenhal, 1837)
