= Acanthoscelidius =

Scientific classification
- Kingdom: Animalia
- Phylum: Arthropoda
- Clade: Pancrustacea
- Class: Insecta
- Order: Coleoptera
- Suborder: Polyphaga
- Infraorder: Cucujiformia
- Superfamily: Curculionoidea
- Family: Curculionidae
- Tribe: Cnemogonini
- Genus: Acanthoscelidius; Hustache, 1930

Genus of beetles

Acanthoscelidius is a genus of minute seed weevils in the beetle family Curculionidae. There are about 14 described species in Acanthoscelidius.

== Species ==
These 14 species belong to the genus Acanthoscelidius:

- Acanthoscelidius acephalus (Say, 1824)^{i g b}
- Acanthoscelidius californicus (Dietz, 1896)^{i c}
- Acanthoscelidius curtus (Say, 1831)^{i b}
- Acanthoscelidius frontalis (Dietz, 1896)^{i c}
- Acanthoscelidius griseus (Dietz, 1896)^{i c}
- Acanthoscelidius guttatus (Dietz, 1896)^{i c b}
- Acanthoscelidius ilex (Dietz, 1896)^{i c}
- Acanthoscelidius isolatus Sleeper, 1955^{i c}
- Acanthoscelidius mendicus (Dietz, 1896)^{i c b}
- Acanthoscelidius perplexus (Dietz, 1896)^{i c}
- Acanthoscelidius pusillus (Dietz, 1896)^{i c}
- Acanthoscelidius tarsalis (Dietz, 1896)^{i c}
- Acanthoscelidius tenebrosus Colonnelli, 2004^{c}
- Acanthoscelidius utahensis (Tanner, 1934)^{i b}

Data sources: i = ITIS, c = Catalogue of Life, g = GBIF, b = Bugguide.net
