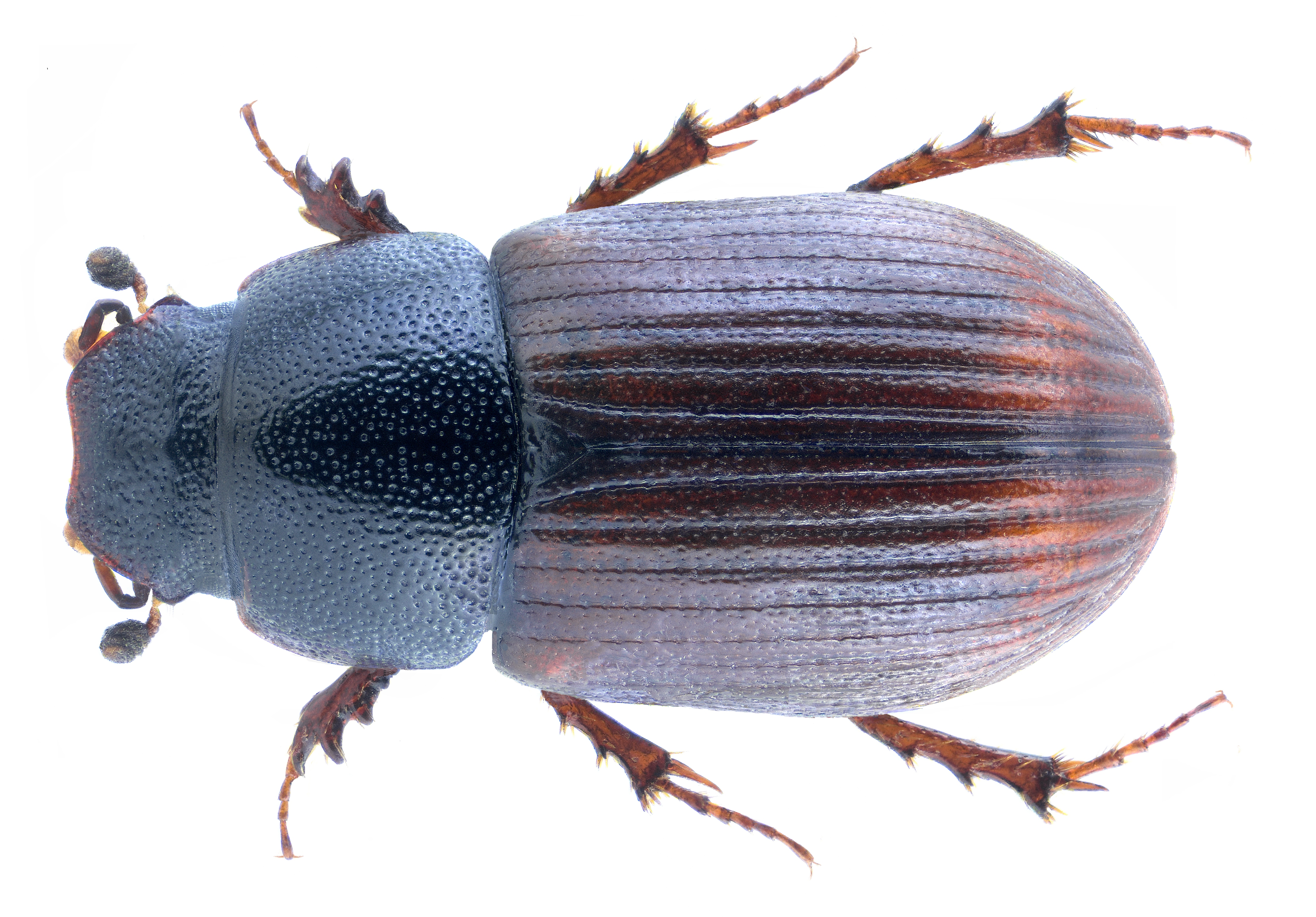
- Agrilinus ibericus, Spain

Scientific classification
- Kingdom: Animalia
- Phylum: Arthropoda
- Clade: Pancrustacea
- Class: Insecta
- Order: Coleoptera
- Suborder: Polyphaga
- Infraorder: Scarabaeiformia
- Family: Scarabaeidae
- Subfamily: Aphodiinae
- Tribe: Aphodiini
- Genus: Agrilinus; Mulsant & Rey, 1869

= Agrilinus =

Genus of beetles

Agrilinus is a genus of beetles belonging to the subfamily Aphodiinae.

The species of this genus are found in the Palearctic.

== Species ==
These 30 species belong to the genus Agrilinus. Many of these species have been transferred from the genus Aphodius.

- Agrilinus ater (De Geer, 1774)
- Agrilinus bardus (Balthasar, 1946)
- Agrilinus bollowi (Balthasar, 1941)
- Agrilinus breviusculus (Motschulsky, 1866)
- Agrilinus constans (Duftschmid, 1805)
- Agrilinus convexus (Erichson, 1848)
- Agrilinus hasegawai (Nomura & Nakane, 1951)
- Agrilinus ibericus (Harold, 1874)
- Agrilinus ishidai (Masumoto & Kiuchi, 1987)
- Agrilinus lindbergi (Petrovitz, 1959)
- Agrilinus lungaiensis (Petrovitz, 1962)
- Agrilinus madara (Nakane, 1960)
- Agrilinus monicae (Stebnicka, 1982)
- Agrilinus monikae Král, 2013
- Agrilinus montisamator (Balthasar, 1965)
- Agrilinus nikolajevi (Berlov, Kalinina & Nikolajev, 1989)
- Agrilinus obliviosus (Reitter, 1892)
- Agrilinus pirinensis (Balthasar, 1946)
- Agrilinus pseudolungaiensis Mencl & Rakovič, 2012
- Agrilinus punctator (Reitter, 1892)
- Agrilinus ritsukoae (Kawai, 2004)
- Agrilinus shilenkovi (Berlov, 1989)
- Agrilinus shukronajevi (Nikolajev, 1998)
- Agrilinus spinulosus (Schmidt, 1910)
- Agrilinus striatus (Schmidt, 1910)
- Agrilinus surdus (Boucomont, 1929)
- Agrilinus tashigaonae (Emberson & Stebnicka, 2001)
- Agrilinus tenax (Balthasar, 1932)
- Agrilinus uniformis (Waterhouse, 1875)
- Agrilinus wassuensis (Petrovitz, 1962)
