= Pelenosomus =

Scientific classification
- Kingdom: Animalia
- Phylum: Arthropoda
- Class: Insecta
- Order: Coleoptera
- Suborder: Polyphaga
- Infraorder: Cucujiformia
- Family: Curculionidae
- Tribe: Cnemogonini
- Genus: Pelenosomus; Dietz, 1896

Genus of beetles

Pelenosomus is a genus of minute seed weevils in the beetle family Curculionidae. There is at least one described species in Pelenosomus, P. cristatus.
