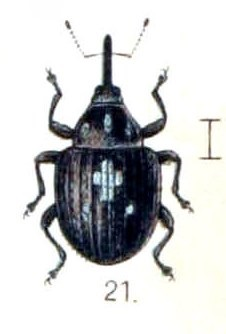
- Auleutes epilobii

Scientific classification
- Domain: Eukaryota
- Kingdom: Animalia
- Phylum: Arthropoda
- Class: Insecta
- Order: Coleoptera
- Suborder: Polyphaga
- Infraorder: Cucujiformia
- Family: Curculionidae
- Genus: Auleutes; Dietz, 1896

= Auleutes (beetle) =

Genus of beetles

Auleutes is a genus of snout and bark beetles in the family Curculionidae. There are at least 30 described species in Auleutes.

== Species ==
- Auleutes alexanderi Korotyaev, 2012
- Auleutes asper (LeConte, 1876)
- Auleutes asperipennis Champion, 1907
- Auleutes ater Dietz, 1896
- Auleutes bigibbosus Colonnelli, 1986
- Auleutes biolleyi Champion, 1907
- Auleutes bosqi Hustache, 1939
- Auleutes cavisternum Champion, 1907
- Auleutes curvipes Dietz, 1896
- Auleutes dispersus Champion, 1907
- Auleutes donaldi
- Auleutes epilobii (Paykull, 1800)
- Auleutes guadeloupensis Ferragu, 1964
- Auleutes immaculatus Hustache, 1940
- Auleutes inermis Champion, 1907
- Auleutes inspersus Champion, 1907
- Auleutes instabilis Champion, 1907
- Auleutes longirostris Dietz, 1896
- Auleutes marionis Fall, 1913
- Auleutes megalops Champion, 1907
- Auleutes mexicanus Champion, 1907
- Auleutes nasalis (LeConte, 1876)
- Auleutes nebulosus (LeConte, 1876)
- Auleutes riguus Colonnelli, 1994
- Auleutes similis Champion, 1907
- Auleutes subfasciatus Dietz, 1896
- Auleutes subnebulosus Hustache, 1947
- Auleutes sulcifrons Champion, 1907
- Auleutes tachygonoides Dietz, 1896
- Auleutes tenuipes (LeConte, 1876)
- Auleutes triplehorni Sleeper, 1955
- Auleutes tuberculatus Dietz, 1896
