= Acanthoscelidius curtus =

Scientific classification
- Domain: Eukaryota
- Kingdom: Animalia
- Phylum: Arthropoda
- Class: Insecta
- Order: Coleoptera
- Suborder: Polyphaga
- Infraorder: Cucujiformia
- Family: Curculionidae
- Genus: Acanthoscelidius
- Species: A. curtus

Binomial name
- Acanthoscelidius curtus (Say, 1831)

Species of weevil beetle

Acanthoscelidius curtus is a species of minute seed weevil in the beetle family Curculionidae. It is found in North America.
