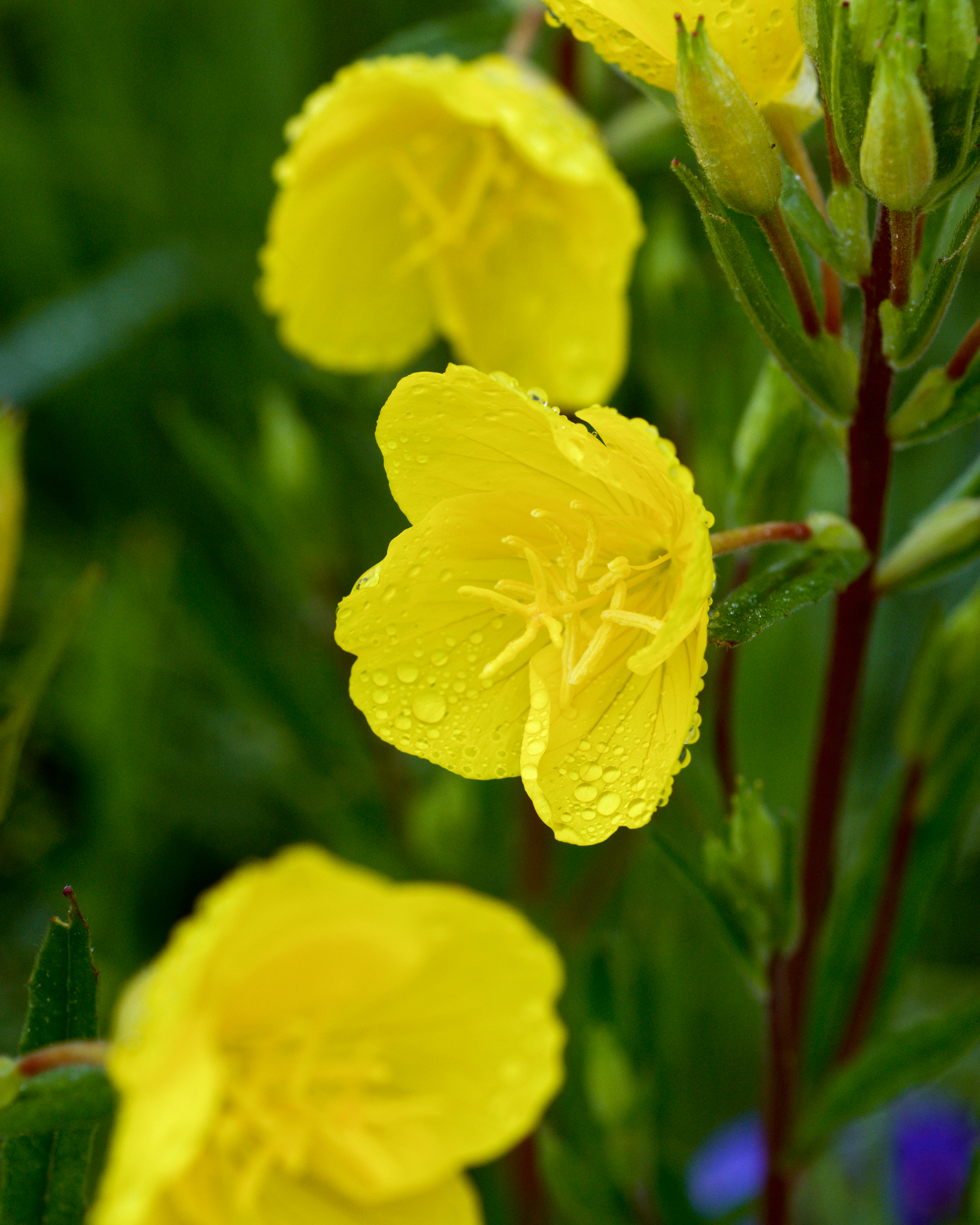
- Oenothera pilosella ssp. sessilis in a prairie remnant in Arkansas

Conservation status
- Secure (NatureServe)

Scientific classification
- Kingdom: Plantae
- Clade: Tracheophytes
- Clade: Angiosperms
- Clade: Eudicots
- Clade: Rosids
- Order: Myrtales
- Family: Onagraceae
- Genus: Oenothera
- Species: O. pilosella

Binomial name
- Oenothera pilosella Raf.

= Oenothera pilosella =

Species of flowering plant

Oenothera pilosella is a species of flowering plant in the evening primrose family known by the common names midwestern evening primrose and meadow evening primrose. It is native to the United States and eastern Canada.

This species is grown as an ornamental garden plant. It produces flowers with yellow petals in late spring and early summer.

There are two subspecies. One, subsp. sessilis, is a rare herb native to the Mississippi River Valley in Louisiana and Arkansas.
