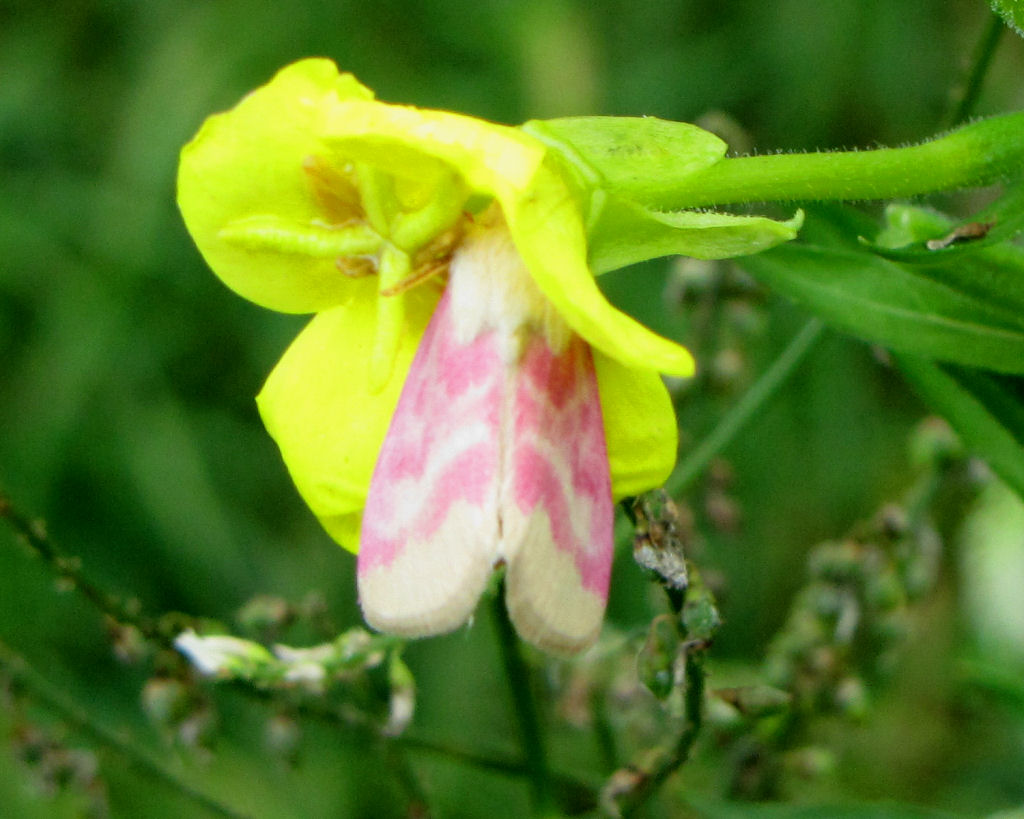
- On evening-primrose

Scientific classification
- Domain: Eukaryota
- Kingdom: Animalia
- Phylum: Arthropoda
- Class: Insecta
- Order: Lepidoptera
- Superfamily: Noctuoidea
- Family: Noctuidae
- Genus: Schinia
- Species: S. florida

Binomial name
- Schinia florida (Guenée, 1852)

= Schinia florida =

Primrose moth

Species of moth

Schinia florida, the primrose moth, is a moth of the family Noctuidae described by Achille Guenée in 1852. Its range includes most of temperate North America aside from the west coast.

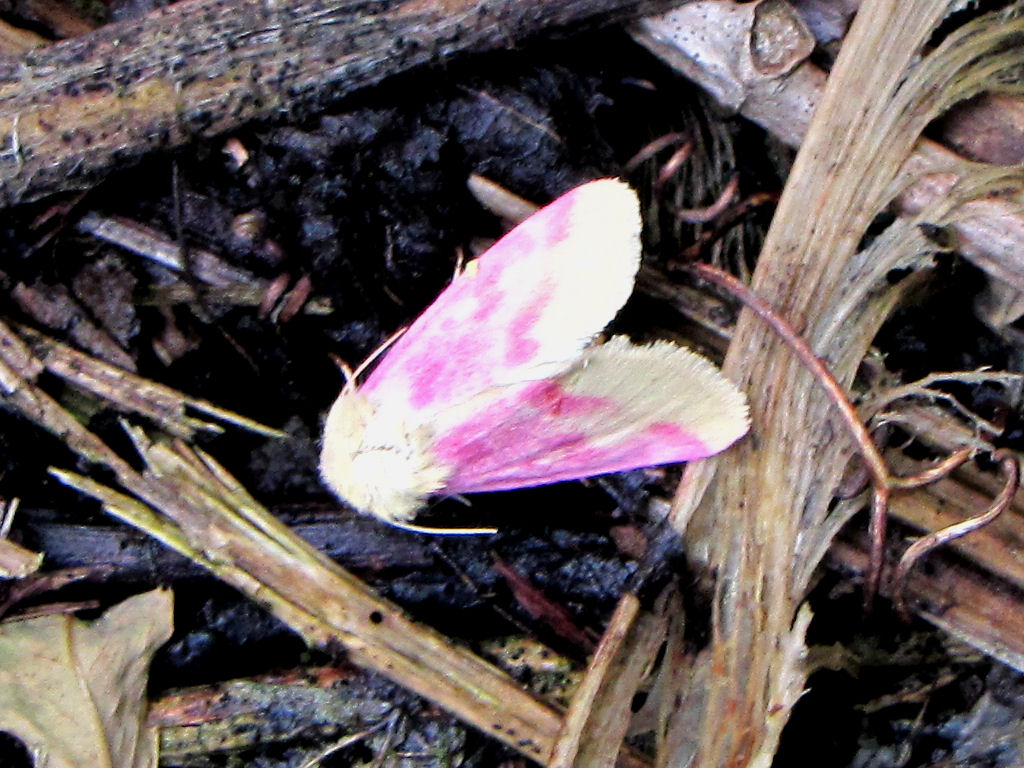
On ground

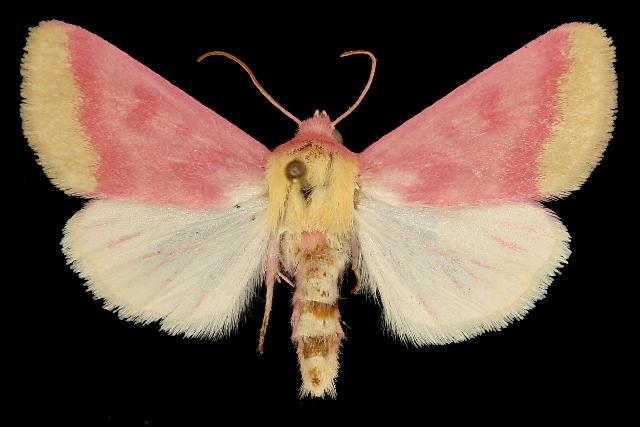
Mounted

Adults have a pink head and pale yellow to creamy white thorax and abdomen. The forewings are pink with pale yellow markings. The hindwings are creamy white. The wingspan is about 30 mm.

Eggs are laid on the flower buds of evening-primroses (Oenothera spp.), which are the larval host plants. Eggs hatch 4–5 days after being laid. Larvae go through five instars before burrowing into the ground to pupate and overwinter.

There is one generation per year, with the adult flight period timed to coincide with the bud development of its larval host plants. Adults are nocturnal, and often rest in the flowers of evening-primroses during the day.
