= Abacetus ater =

Scientific classification
- Kingdom: Animalia
- Phylum: Arthropoda
- Class: Insecta
- Order: Coleoptera
- Suborder: Adephaga
- Family: Carabidae
- Genus: Abacetus
- Species: A. ater

Binomial name
- Abacetus ater W.J.Macleay, 1871

Species of beetle

Abacetus ater is a species of ground beetle in the subfamily Pterostichinae. It was described by W.J. Macleay in 1871 and is an endemic species found in Australia.
