= Agrilinus lungaiensis =

Scientific classification
- Kingdom: Animalia
- Phylum: Arthropoda
- Clade: Pancrustacea
- Class: Insecta
- Order: Coleoptera
- Suborder: Polyphaga
- Infraorder: Scarabaeiformia
- Family: Scarabaeidae
- Genus: Agrilinus
- Species: A. lungaiensis

Binomial name
- Agrilinus lungaiensis (Petrovitz, 1962)

Synonyms
- Aphodius (Agrilinus) lungaiensis Petrovitz, 1962

Species of beetle

Agrilinus lungaiensis is a species of beetle of the family Scarabaeidae. It is found in China (Shaanxi, Sichuan).

== Description ==
Adults reach a length of about 4.3 mm (0.17 in). The head and pronotum are black, with the sides of the latter translucent yellowish-red and glossy. The elytra are dull and dark pitch-brown, with the tips and a spot reddish.
