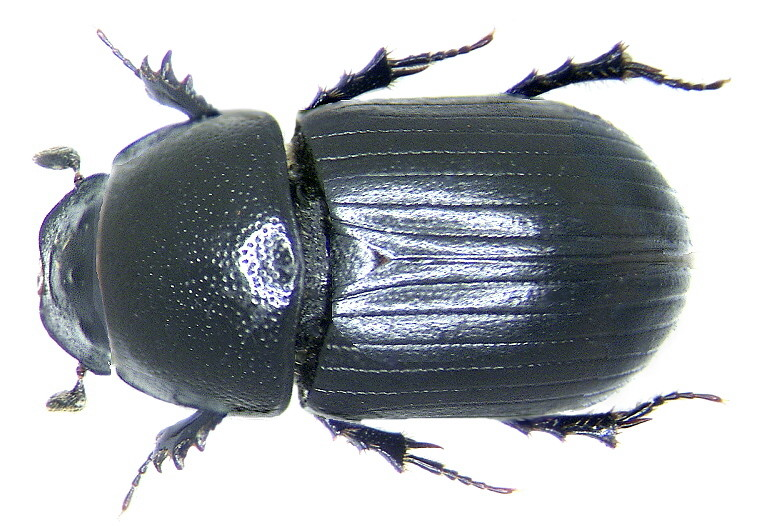

Scientific classification
- Kingdom: Animalia
- Phylum: Arthropoda
- Clade: Pancrustacea
- Class: Insecta
- Order: Coleoptera
- Suborder: Polyphaga
- Infraorder: Scarabaeiformia
- Family: Scarabaeidae
- Genus: Agrilinus
- Species: A. ater

Binomial name
- Agrilinus ater (Degeer, 1774)

Synonyms
- Scarabaeus ater Degeer, 1774; Aphodius ater; Aphodius ater mediocris Schmidt, 1917; Aphodius terrenus Stephens, 1830; Scarabaeus obscurus Marsham, 1802; Scarabaeus pusillus Marsham, 1802; Scarabaeus terrestris Fabricius, 1775

= Agrilinus ater =

Species of beetle

Agrilinus ater is a species of beetle in family Scarabaeidae, found in the Palearctic, where it has been recorded from Austria, Belarus, Belgium, Bosnia Herzegovina, China:Xinjiang, Croatia, Czech Republic, Denmark, Finland, France, Georgia, Germany, Great Britain, Ireland, Italy, Kazakhstan, Kyrgyzstan, Latvia, Lithuania, Luxembourg, Macedonia, Moldova, Mongolia, Montenegro, Netherlands, Norway, Poland, Romania, Russia, Russia Far East, Siberia, Slovakia, Slovenia, Spain, Sweden, Switzerland, Ukraine and Uzbekistan.

== Description ==
Adults reach a length of about 4.7–6.7 mm (0.19–0.26 in). They have a stout, subparallel, strongly convex, glabrous body. The head and pronotum are shiny, and the elytra are strongly alutaceous. They are black, with the elytra sometimes reddish.

== Biology ==
It is a mid-successional species of sheep and cattle dung.

== Taxonomy ==
This species was formerly a member of the genus Aphodius.
