= Kudzu of the North =

Kudzu of the North may refer to:

- Persicaria perfoliata (esp. NJ to Mass), a.k.a. Polygonum perfoliatum, mile-a-minute weed, Asiatic tearthumb, devil's tearthumb, or devil's tail
- Celastrus orbiculatus, a.k.a. oriental (or Japanese or Asiatic) bittersweet
