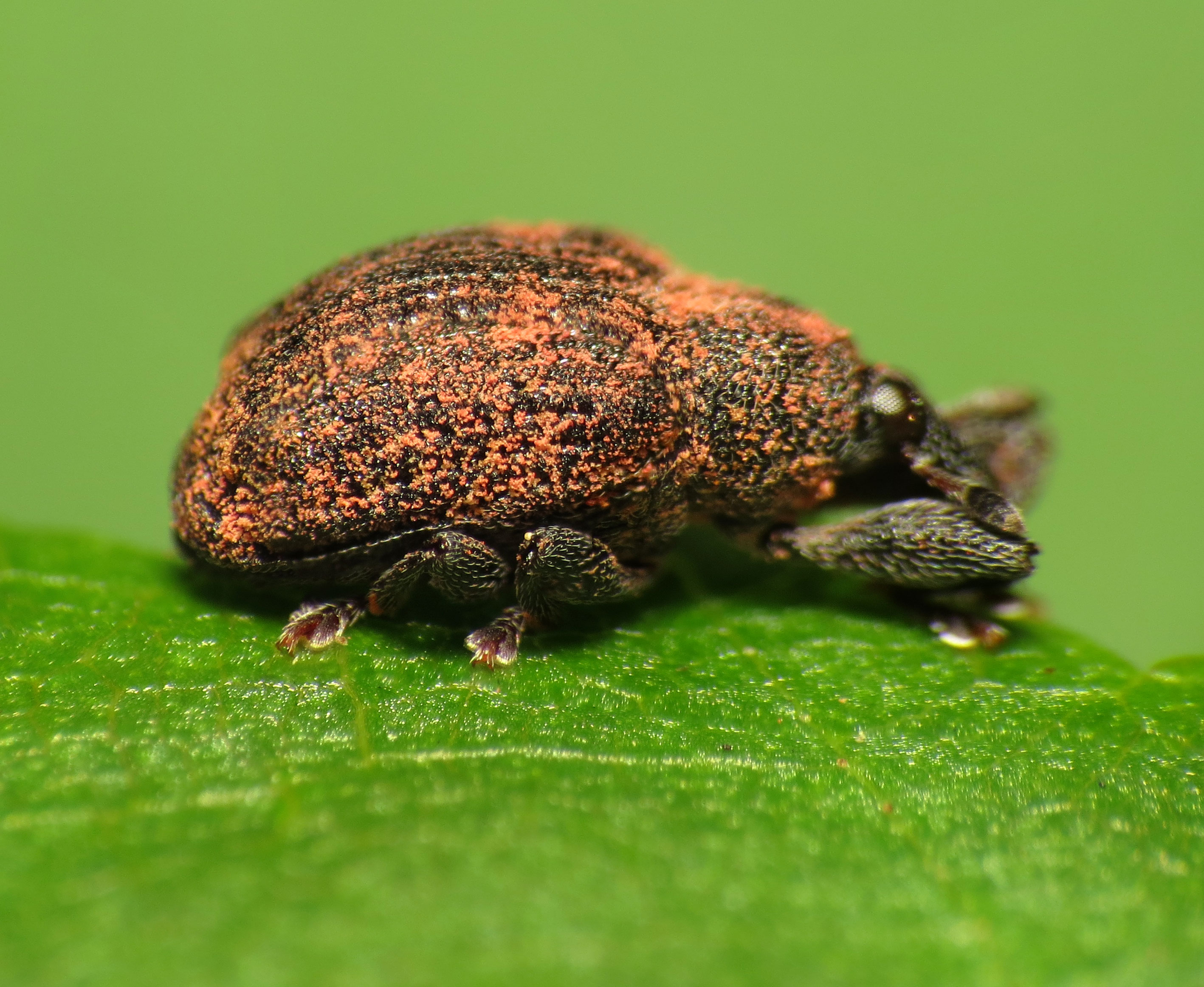
- Rhinoncomimus latipes

Scientific classification
- Kingdom: Animalia
- Phylum: Arthropoda
- Class: Insecta
- Order: Coleoptera
- Suborder: Polyphaga
- Infraorder: Cucujiformia
- Family: Curculionidae
- Subfamily: Ceutorhynchinae
- Tribe: Phytobiini; Gistel, 1848

= Phytobiini =

Tribe of beetles

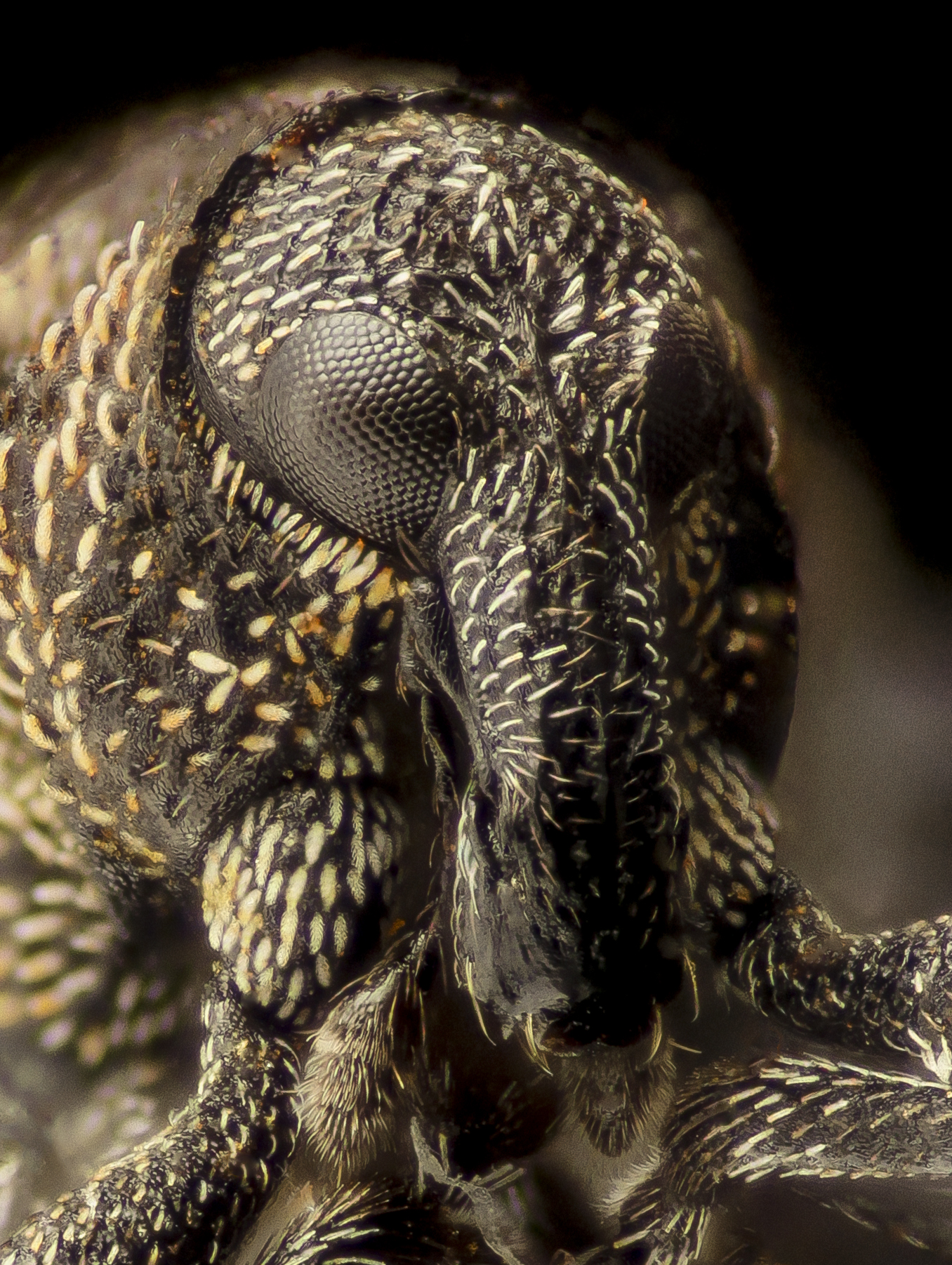
Rhinoncomimus latipes

Phytobiini is a tribe of minute seed weevils in the beetle family Curculionidae. There are about 7 genera and 18 described species in Phytobiini.

== Genera ==
These nine genera belong to the tribe Phytobiini:

- Eubrychius
- Euhrychiopsis Dietz, 1896^{i g b}
- Marmaropus
- Neophytobius Wagner, 1936^{i c g b}
- Parenthis Dietz, 1896^{i g b}
- Pelenomus C.G.Thomson, 1859^{c g b}
- Phytobius Schönherr, 1833^{i c g b}
- Rhinoncomimus Wagner, 1940^{c g b}
- Rhinoncus Schönherr, 1825^{i c g b}

Data sources: i = ITIS, c = Catalogue of Life, g = GBIF, b = Bugguide.net
