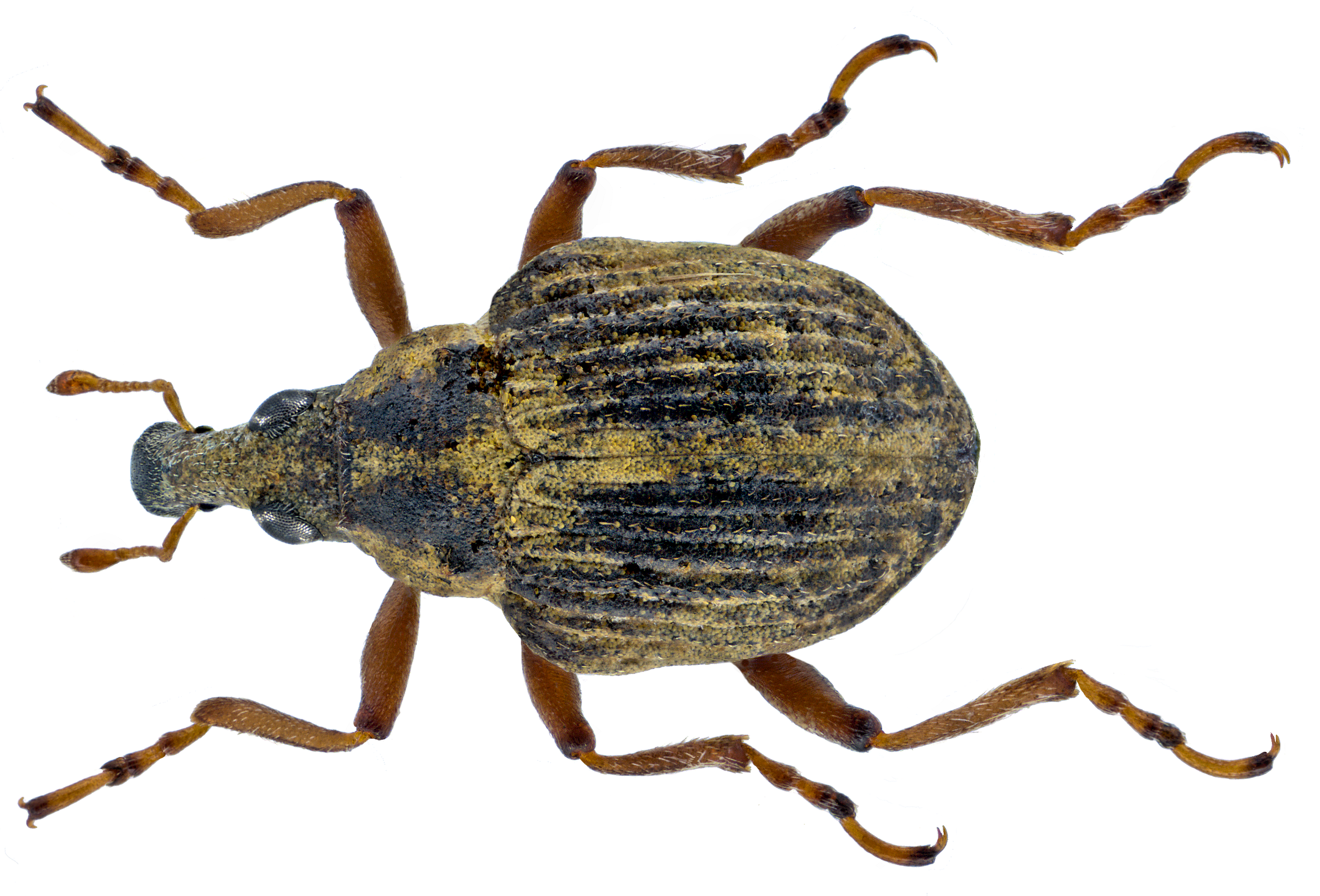
- Eubrychius velutus

Scientific classification
- Domain: Eukaryota
- Kingdom: Animalia
- Phylum: Arthropoda
- Class: Insecta
- Order: Coleoptera
- Suborder: Polyphaga
- Infraorder: Cucujiformia
- Family: Curculionidae
- Subfamily: Ceutorhynchinae
- Tribe: Phytobiini
- Genus: Eubrychius; Thomson, 1859

= Eubrychius =

Genus of beetles

Eubrychius is a genus of beetles belonging to the family Curculionidae.

The species of this genus are found in Europe.

Species:

- Eubrychius aquaticus Thomson, 1859
- Eubrychius lecontei Dietz, 1896
- Eubrychius velutus Heyden, 1908
