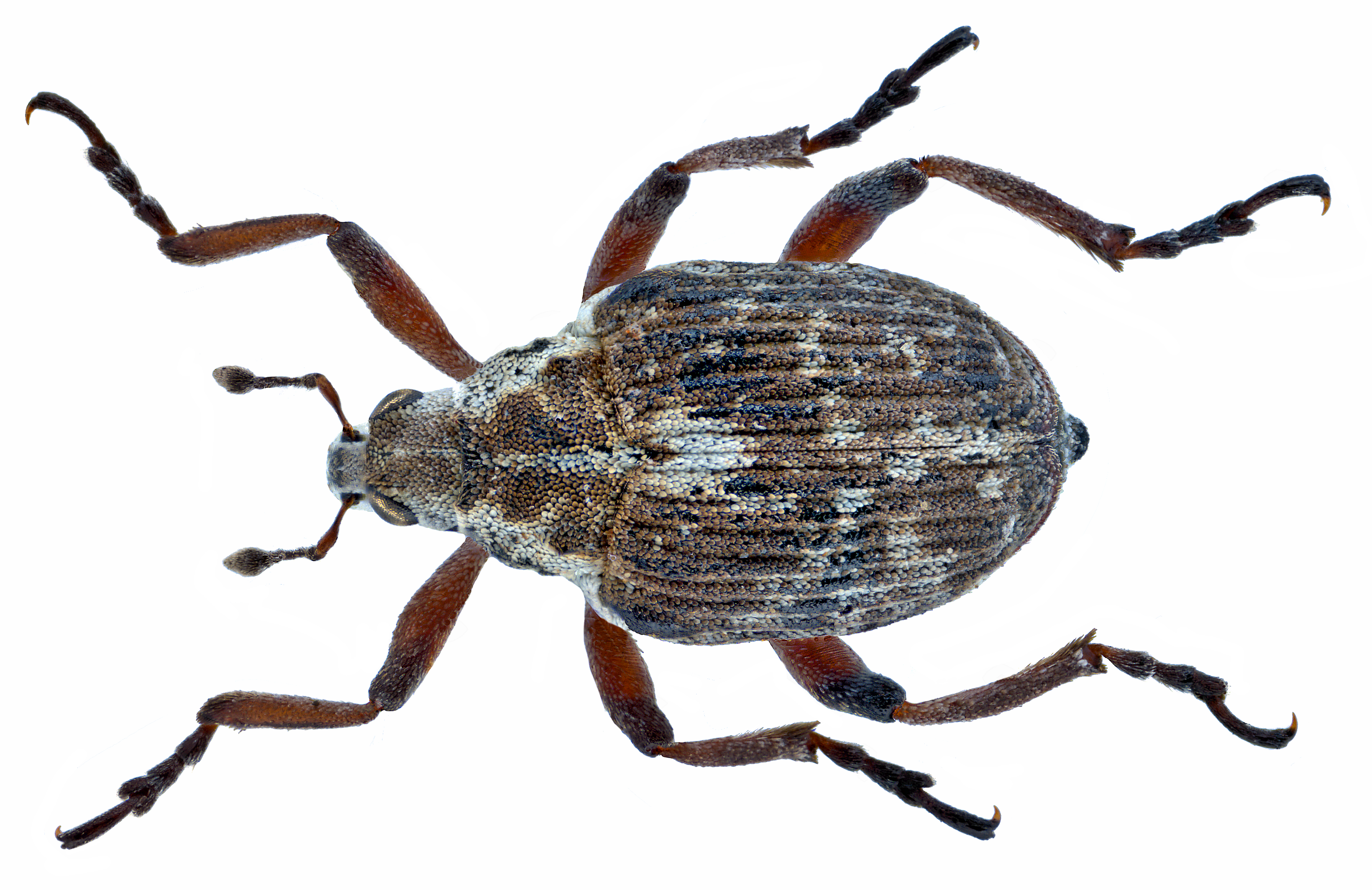

Scientific classification
- Kingdom: Animalia
- Phylum: Arthropoda
- Class: Insecta
- Order: Coleoptera
- Suborder: Polyphaga
- Infraorder: Cucujiformia
- Superfamily: Curculionoidea
- Family: Curculionidae
- Genus: Phytobius
- Species: P. leucogaster

Binomial name
- Phytobius leucogaster (Marsham, 1802)

= Phytobius leucogaster =

Species of beetle

Phytobius leucogaster is a species of weevil native to Europe.
