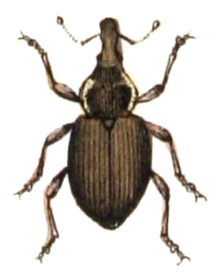
- Pelenomus commari

Scientific classification
- Kingdom: Animalia
- Phylum: Arthropoda
- Class: Insecta
- Order: Coleoptera
- Suborder: Polyphaga
- Infraorder: Cucujiformia
- Family: Curculionidae
- Subfamily: Ceutorhynchinae
- Tribe: Phytobiini
- Genus: Pelenomus; Thomson, 1859

Synonyms
- List: Lophotropidius Wagner, 1938; Pachyrhinus Stephens, 1829; Pachyrrhinus Bedel, 1883; Paleonomus Hoffmann, 1954; Paraphytobius Wagner, 1936; Pelonomus Bedel, 1885; Phitobias Dietz, 1896; Phytobius Dejean, 1835; Phytonobius Schoenherr, 1837; Rhinoncus O'Brien & Wibmer, 1982

= Pelenomus =

Genus of beetles

Pelenomus is a genus of beetles belonging to the family Curculionidae.

The species of this genus are found in Europe and North America.

== Species ==
The following species are recognised in the genus Pelenomus:

- Pelenomus asperulus Dietz, 1896
- Pelenomus canaliculatus (Fåhraeus, 1843)
- Pelenomus cavifrons Leconte, 1876
- Pelenomus commari (G.W.F.Panzer, 1795)
- Pelenomus congenialis (Dietz, 1896)
- Pelenomus curvatus Yang & Huang
- Pelenomus gracilipes Dietz, 1896
- Pelenomus impressiventris Blatchley & Leng, 1916
- Pelenomus niveus Blatchley & Leng, 1916
- Pelenomus pusillus Dietz, 1896
- Pelenomus quadricorniger (Colonnelli, 1986)
- Pelenomus quadrituberculatus (Fabricius, 1787)
- Pelenomus squamosus Le Conte, 1876
- Pelenomus squamosus Lec.
- Pelenomus sulcicollis J.Lec., 1876
- Pelenomus thoracespinosus (J.A.E.Goeze, 1777)
