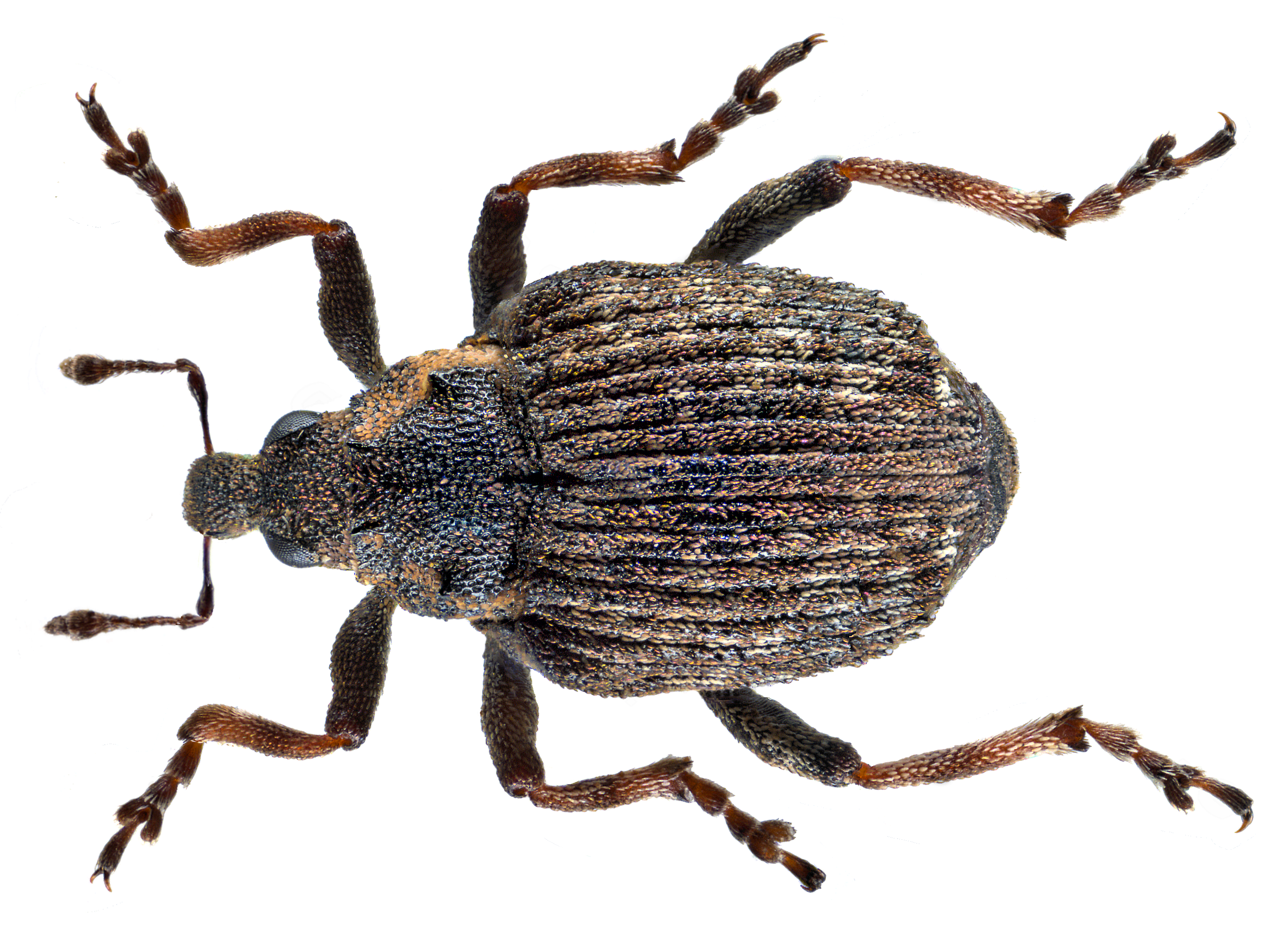

Scientific classification
- Kingdom: Animalia
- Phylum: Arthropoda
- Clade: Pancrustacea
- Class: Insecta
- Order: Coleoptera
- Suborder: Polyphaga
- Infraorder: Cucujiformia
- Superfamily: Curculionoidea
- Family: Curculionidae
- Genus: Pelenomus
- Species: P. quadrituberculatus

Binomial name
- Pelenomus quadrituberculatus (Fabricius, 1787)

= Pelenomus quadrituberculatus =

Species of beetle

Pelenomus quadrituberculatus is a species of weevil native to Europe.
