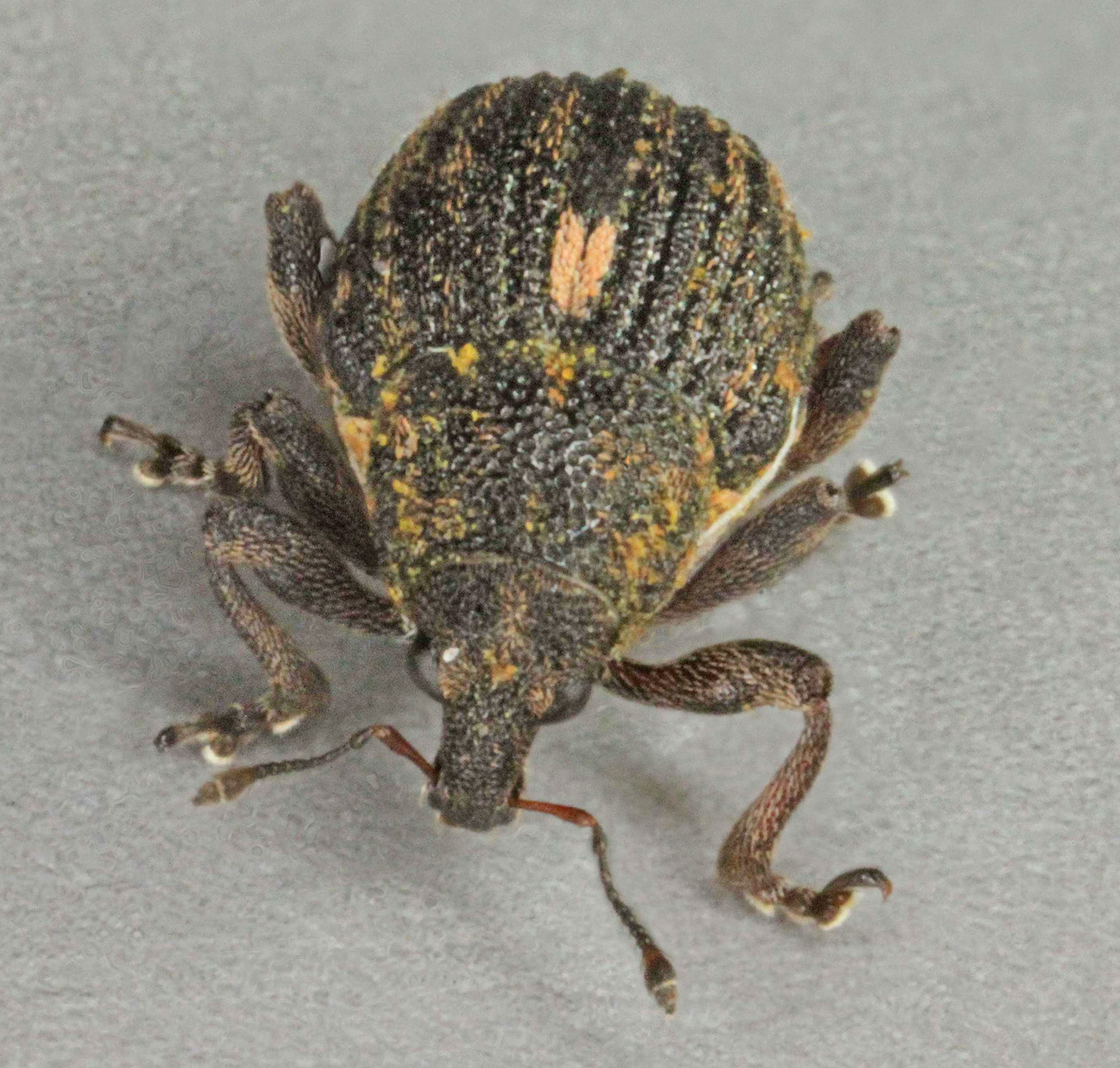

Scientific classification
- Kingdom: Animalia
- Phylum: Arthropoda
- Class: Insecta
- Order: Coleoptera
- Suborder: Polyphaga
- Infraorder: Cucujiformia
- Family: Curculionidae
- Genus: Rhinoncus
- Species: R. pericarpius

Binomial name
- Rhinoncus pericarpius (Linnaeus, 1758)

Synonyms
- List: Campylirhynchus castor (J.C.Fabricius, 1792); Campylirhynchus interstitialis Dejean & P.F.M.A., 1821; Cryptorhis castor (J.C.Fabricius, 1792); Cryptorhis interstitialis (G.C.Reich, 1797); Cryptorhis pericarpia (C.Linnaeus, 1758); Cryptoris herbstii Billberg, 1820; Curculio castor J.C.Fabricius, 1792; Curculio fruticolosus L.Gyllenhal, 1813; Curculio fruticulosus J.F.W.Herbst, 1795; Curculio interstitialis G.C.Reich, 1797; Curculio pericarpius C.Linnaeus, 1758; Curculio scabratus J.C.Fabricius, 1792; Rhinoncus castor (Fabricius, 1792); Rhinoncus pericarpus Linnaeus, 1758; Rhynchaenus castor (J.C.Fabricius, 1792); Rhynchaenus fruticulosus (J.F.W.Herbst, 1795); Rhynchaenus pericarpius (C.Linnaeus, 1758); Rhynchaenus scabratus (J.C.Fabricius, 1792); Rhynchaenus seniculus J.L.C.Gravenhorst, 1807

= Rhinoncus pericarpius =

Species of beetle

Rhinoncus pericarpius is a species of weevil native to Europe.
