= Florpyrauxifen-benzyl =

Aquatic herbicide

Names
- IUPAC name Benzyl 4-amino-3-chloro-6-(4-chloro-2-fluoro-3-methoxyphenyl)-5-fluoropyridine-2-carboxylate
- Other names ProcellaCOR

Identifiers
CAS Number	1390661-72-9
3D model (JSmol)	Interactive image
ChEBI	CHEBI:133651
ChemSpider	49612658
ECHA InfoCard	100.249.071
EC Number	815-125-3
PubChem CID	70495450
UNII	38NVT24JZA
CompTox Dashboard (EPA)	DTXSID00894941
- InChI: InChI=1S/C20H14Cl2F2N2O3/c1-28-19-12(21)8-7-11(14(19)23)17-15(24)16(25)13(22)18(26-17)20(27)29-9-10-5-3-2-4-6-10/h2-8H,9H2,1H3,(H2,25,26) Key: WNZCDFOXYNRBRB-UHFFFAOYSA-N
- SMILES: COC1=C(C=CC(=C1F)C2=NC(=C(C(=C2F)N)Cl)C(=O)OCC3=CC=CC=C3)Cl

Properties
Chemical formula	C_{20}H_{14}Cl_{2}F_{2}N_{2}O_{3}
Molar mass	439.24 g·mol^{−1}

Hazards
- GHS labelling
Pictograms	(GHS07: Exclamation mark) (GHS09: Environmental hazard)
Signal word	Warning
Hazard statements	H317, H410
Precautionary statements	P261, P272, P273, P280, P302+P352, P321, P333+P317, P362+P364, P391, P501
- Except where otherwise noted, data are given for materials in their standard state (at 25 °C [77 °F], 100 kPa). Infobox references

Florpyrauxifen-benzyl is an aquatic herbicide used to manage invasive aquatic plants such as Myriophyllum spicatum (Eurasian watermilfoil). It was assessed by the EPA in 2017 and then registered by the EPA in 2018. It was registered by the Health Canada Pest Management Regulatory Agency in 2023. It is the active ingredient in herbicidal products such as ProcellaCOR.

In the fall of 2024, Farlain Lake, Ontario, was the first freshwater Canadian lake to be treated with ProcellaCOR.

In June 2024, Minnesota Department of Agriculture listed florpyrauxifen-benzyl as meeting the definition of a PFAS. However, the Chautauqua Lake Partnership quotes the New York State Department of Environmental Conservation as stating:

"New York State approved its registration in 2019. EPA’s review of current federally registered pesticides found 'no pesticide active or inert ingredients with structures similar to prominent PFAS such as PFOS, PFOA, and GenX.'"

In June 2024, ProcellaCOR was used to treat two sites on Lake George, New York. Testing in 2025 found that it was effective in managing the targeted plants while having negligible impact on native plants. The testing found the expected degradants from ProcellaCOR along with detectable amounts of its active ingredient (florpyrauxifen-benzyl) in core samples 15 to 20 cm deep.

In March, 2025, it was reported that the Okanagan Water Basin Board, located in the Okanagan Valley, British Columbia, was against the application of ProcellaCOR and that the Okanagan Nation Alliance supported their position.
