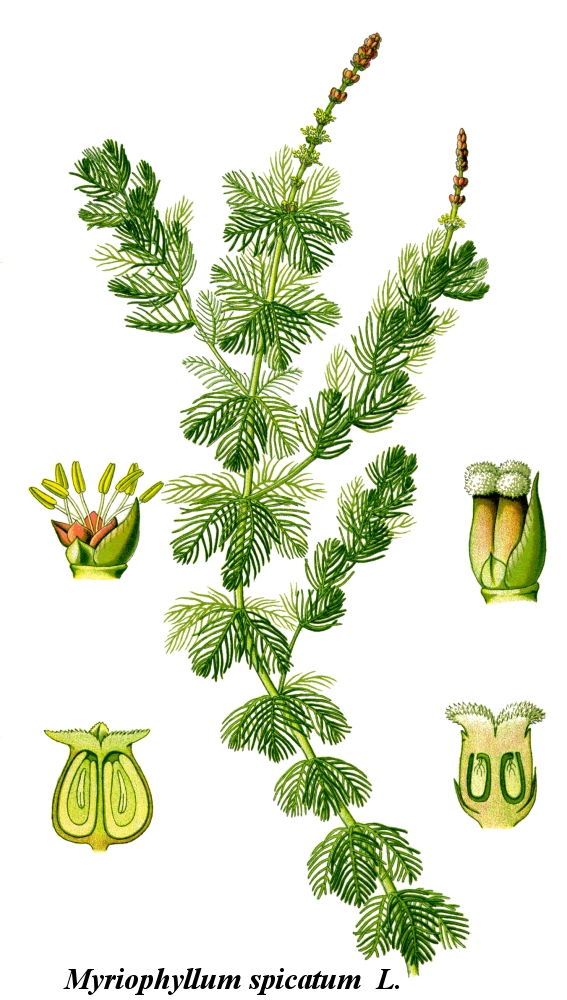

Conservation status
- Least Concern (IUCN 3.1)

Scientific classification
- Kingdom: Plantae
- Clade: Tracheophytes
- Clade: Angiosperms
- Clade: Eudicots
- Order: Saxifragales
- Family: Haloragaceae
- Genus: Myriophyllum
- Species: M. spicatum

Binomial name
- Myriophyllum spicatum L., 1753

Synonyms
- List: Myriophyllum pusillum Blume (1850); Myriophyllum spicatum var. baicalense Czepinoga (2008); Myriophyllum spicatum var. majus Hartm. (1820); Myriophyllum spicatum var. minus Gray 1822); Myriophyllum spicatum var. tenellum Hartm. (1820); Myriophyllum verticillatum subsp. spicatum (L.) Bonnier & Layens (1894)

= Myriophyllum spicatum =

Plant species in the watermilfoil family

Myriophyllum spicatum (Eurasian watermilfoil or spiked water-milfoil) is a submerged perennial aquatic plant which grows in still or slow-moving water. Eurasian watermilfoil is native to Europe, Asia, and North Africa, but has a wide geographic and climatic distribution among some 57 countries, extending from northern Canada to South Africa. It is considered to be a highly invasive species.

== Description ==
Eurasian watermilfoil has slender stems up to 250 centimetres (8.2 ft) long. The submerged leaves (usually between 15–35 mm long) are borne in pinnate whorls of four, with numerous thread-like leaflets roughly 4–13 mm long. Plants are monoecious with flowers produced in the leaf axils (male above, female below) on a spike 5–15 cm long held vertically above the water surface, each flower is inconspicuous, orange-red, 4–6 mm long. Eurasian watermilfoil has 12–21 pairs of leaflets while northern watermilfoil M. sibiricum only has 5–9 pairs. The two can hybridize and the resulting hybrid plants can cause taxonomic confusion as leaf characters are intermediate and can overlap with parent species.

== Chemistry ==
Myriophyllum spicatum produces ellagic, gallic and pyrogallic acids and (+)-catechin, allelopathic polyphenols inhibiting the growth of blue-green alga Microcystis aeruginosa.

== Distribution ==
Myriophyllum spicatum is found in disperse regions of North America, Europe, Asia, Australia, and Africa.

== Invasive species ==
=== Introduced areas ===
Myriophyllum spicatum was likely first introduced to North America in the 1940s where it has become an invasive species in some areas. By the mid 1970s, watermilfoil had also covered thousands of hectares in British Columbia and Ontario, Canada, and spread some 500 kilometres (310 mi) downstream via the Columbia River system into the Pacific Northwest of the United States. Eurasian watermilfoil is now found across most of Northern America where it is recognized as a noxious weed.

=== Impact ===
In lakes or other aquatic areas where native aquatic plants are not well established, the Eurasian watermilfoil plant can spread quickly. Eurasian watermilfoil has been known to crowd out native plants and create dense mats that interfere with recreational activity. Dense growth of Eurasian milfoil can also have a negative impact on fisheries by creating microhabitats for juvenile fish and obstructing space for larger fish, ultimately disrupting normal feeding patterns. Due to the Eurasian milfoil plant's inability to provide the same microhabitat for invertebrates created by native aquatic plant species, densely populated areas of Eurasian milfoil create an ecosystem with fewer food sources for the surrounding fish. Dense Eurasian milfoil growth can also create hypoxic zones by blocking out sun penetration to native aquatic vegetation, preventing them from photosynthesizing. Eurasian watermilfoil grows primarily from broken off stems, known as shoot fragments, which increases the rate at which the plant can spread and grow. In some areas, the Eurasian Watermilfoil is an Aquatic Nuisance Species. Eurasian watermilfoil is known to hybridize with the native northern watermilfoil (M. sibiricum) and the hybrid taxon has also become invasive in North America. This hybridization has been observed across the upper midwestern United States (Indiana, Minnesota, Michigan, Wisconsin) and in the Northwest (Idaho, Washington).

=== Control and management ===
It is impossible to completely eradicate the species once Eurasian watermilfoil is established. As a result, removal must be done to reduce an infestation to levels affordably controlled, with continued maintenance thereafter. Effective management techniques include insect biocontrol and hand-harvesting of the plant.

The aquatic moth Acentria ephemerella, the water veneer moth, feeds upon and damages this water milfoil. It has been used as an agent of biological pest control against the plant in North America. The milfoil weevil (Euhrychiopsis lecontei) has also been used as biocontrol.

Another method for biocontrol is grass carp, (one of the Asian carp species) which have been bred as sterile and is sometimes released into affected areas. These fish primarily feed on aquatic plants and have proven effective at controlling the spread. However, the carp prefer many native species over the milfoil and will usually devastate preferred species before eating the milfoil. In Washington State the success rate of grass carp has been less than expected, where they were used in 98 lakes, and 39 percent of them had no submerged plant life left after only a short time.

Hand-harvesting of invasive milfoils has shown much success as a management technique since around 2000. Several organizations in the New England states have undertaken large scale, lake-wide hand-harvesting management programs with extremely successful results. Well trained divers with proper techniques have been able to effectively control and then maintain many lakes, especially in the Adirondack Park in Northern New York where chemicals, mechanical harvesters, and other disruptive and largely unsuccessful management techniques are banned. After only three years of hand harvesting in Saranac Lake the program was able to reduce the amount harvested from over 18 tons to just 800 pounds per year.

Raking is not recommended as milfoil will reproduce from the fragments. However, raking can be useful for clearing channels.

In order to prevent damages from mass growth of the plant in lakes, the water level can be lowered. By freezing out the bottom of the bank in the winter months, the population of the plant decreases.

ProcellaCOR, an aquatic herbicide, has also been used to control infestations.

=== Spread prevention ===
Trailering boats has proven to be a significant vector by which Eurasian milfoil is able to spread and proliferate across otherwise disconnected bodies of water. Effective methods for mitigating this spread include visual inspections with subsequent hand removal and pressure washing upon boat removal. In the Okanagan River Basin of south-central British Columbia, a specially-adapted rototiller is used to dredge shallow water to damage or destroy the root system.
