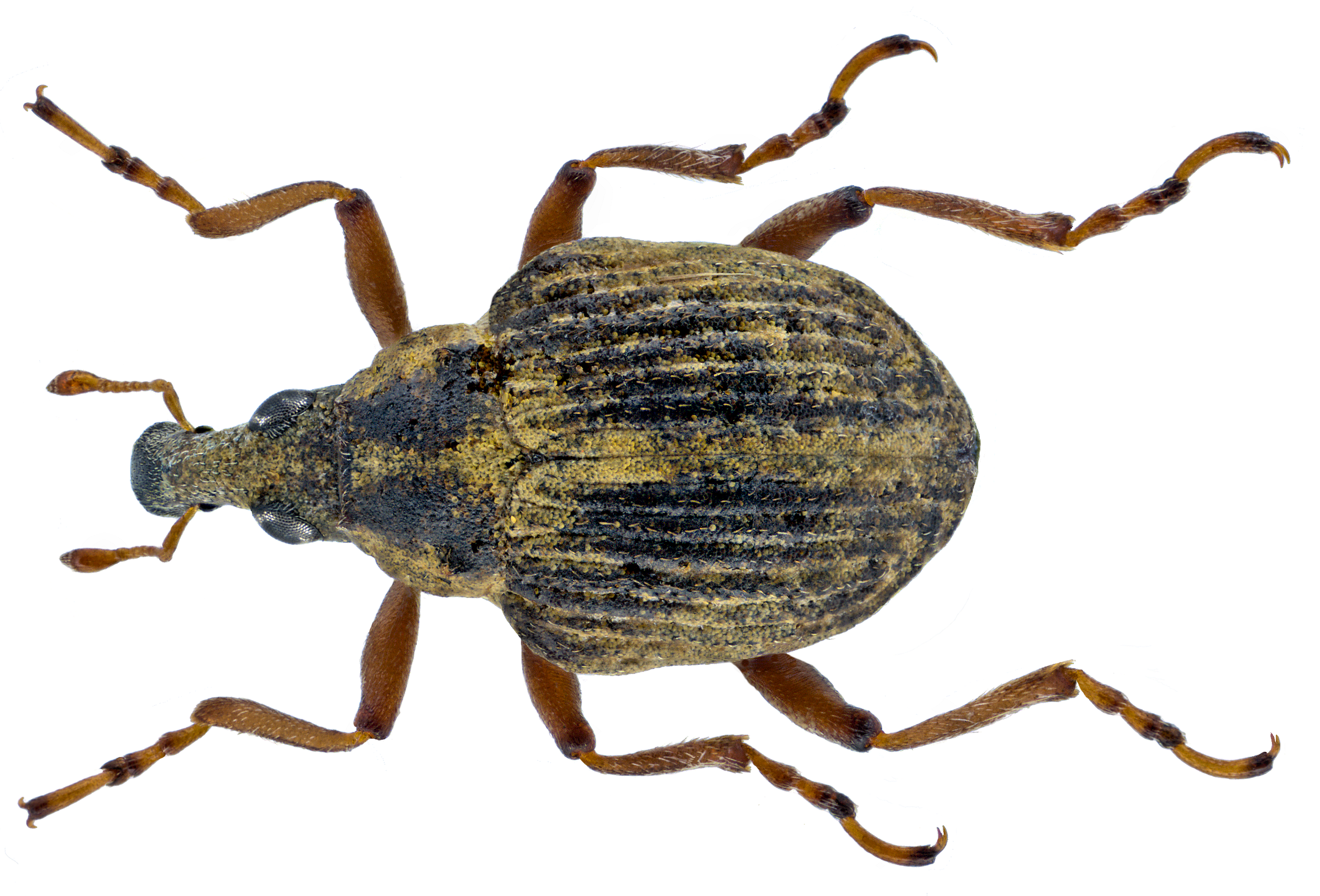

Scientific classification
- Domain: Eukaryota
- Kingdom: Animalia
- Phylum: Arthropoda
- Class: Insecta
- Order: Coleoptera
- Suborder: Polyphaga
- Infraorder: Cucujiformia
- Family: Curculionidae
- Genus: Eubrychius
- Species: E. velutus

Binomial name
- Eubrychius velutus (Beck, 1817)

= Eubrychius velutus =

Species of beetle

Eubrychius velutus is a species of weevil native to Europe.
