= Neophytobius =

Scientific classification
- Kingdom: Animalia
- Phylum: Arthropoda
- Class: Insecta
- Order: Coleoptera
- Suborder: Polyphaga
- Infraorder: Cucujiformia
- Family: Curculionidae
- Tribe: Phytobiini
- Genus: Neophytobius; Wagner, 1936

Genus of beetles

Neophytobius is a genus of minute seed weevils in the beetle family Curculionidae. There are at least two described species in Neophytobius.

== Species ==
These two species belong to the genus Neophytobius:

- Neophytobius cavifrons (LeConte, 1876)^{i c b}
- Neophytobius muricatus (Brisout de Barneville, 1862)^{g}

Data sources: i = ITIS, c = Catalogue of Life, g = GBIF, b = Bugguide.net
