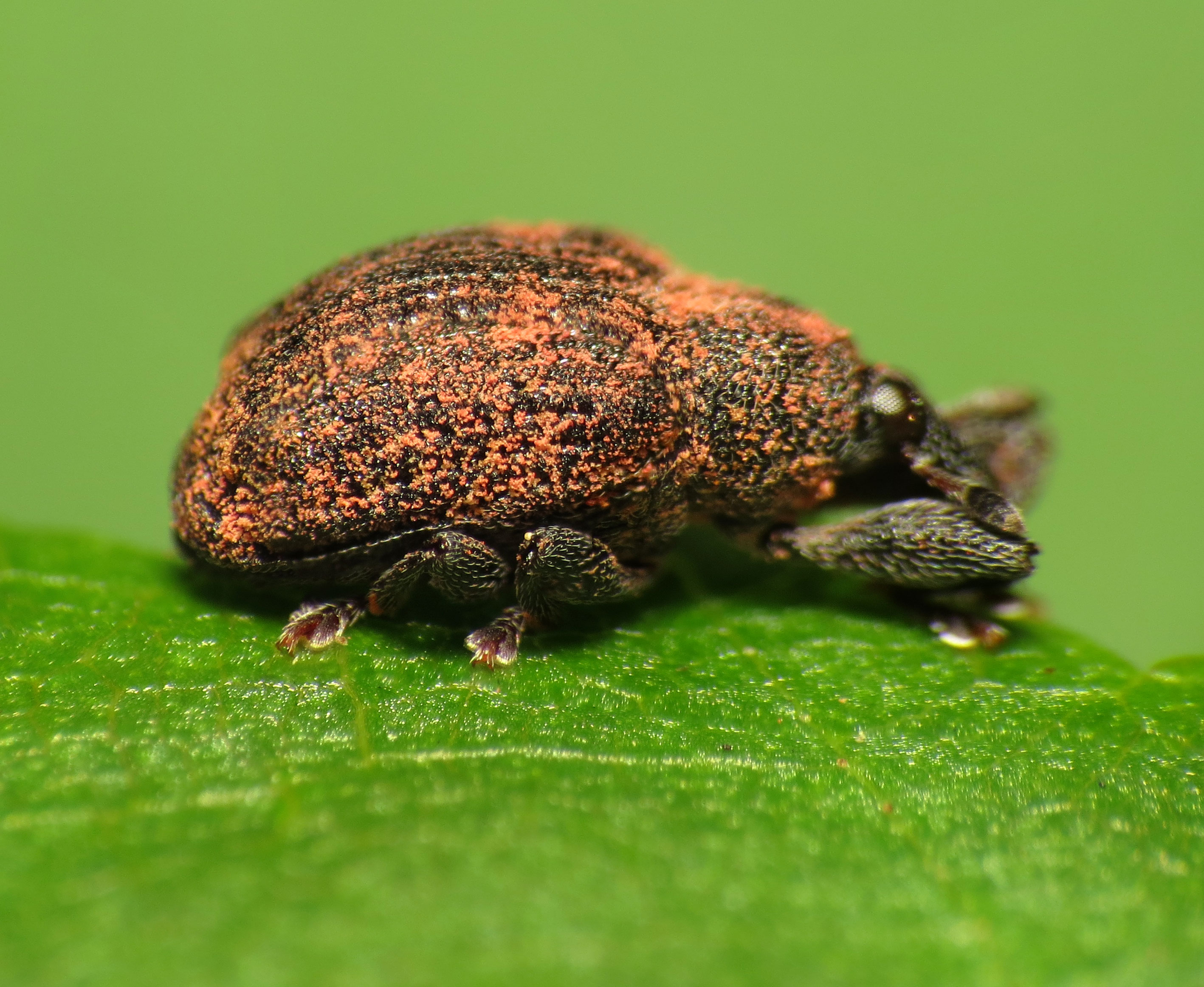

Scientific classification
- Kingdom: Animalia
- Phylum: Arthropoda
- Clade: Pancrustacea
- Class: Insecta
- Order: Coleoptera
- Suborder: Polyphaga
- Infraorder: Cucujiformia
- Superfamily: Curculionoidea
- Family: Curculionidae
- Genus: Rhinoncomimus
- Species: R. latipes

Binomial name
- Rhinoncomimus latipes Korotyaev

= Rhinoncomimus latipes =

Species of beetle

Rhinoncomimus latipes, the mile-a-minute weevil, is a species of weevil in the family of beetles known as Curculionidae.

== Life cycle ==
Rhinoncomimus latipes is highly co-evolved with its host plant (Persicaria perfoliata or Polygonum perfoliatum), commonly known as mile-a-minute or Asiatic tearthumb, and has only been found to successfully reproduce on mile-a-minute. Adults overwinter in leaf litter and emerge early in spring to feed on leaves and mate. Female R. latipes lay eggs preferentially on the compact flowering head of the plant, a tender location that allows larvae to easily bore into the stem. After 3-5 days, larvae emerge and bore into the stem to feed and develop. Stem boring and internal feeding by larvae significantly reduces the growth and reproductive ability of P. perfoliata. Fully grown larvae drop into the soil to pupate and emerge as adults by climbing up nearby stems, approximately one month after egg laying. Three to four overlapping generations can occur during a growing season.

== Use in Weed Biocontrol ==
Originally from Asia, Rhinoncomimus latipes was intentionally introduced in North America in 2004 to control mile-a-minute, which is invasive in several Northeast US states. Rhinoncomimus latipes has been effective thus far at controlling mile-a-minute populations where it has been released, strongly preferring mile-a-minute as a host to nontarget native plants, but travels slowly. R. latipes has a dispersal rate of approximately 4.3 km/yr from release points. R. latipes has been released by hand and aerially from UAs in "bug pods" in hard-to-access locations.

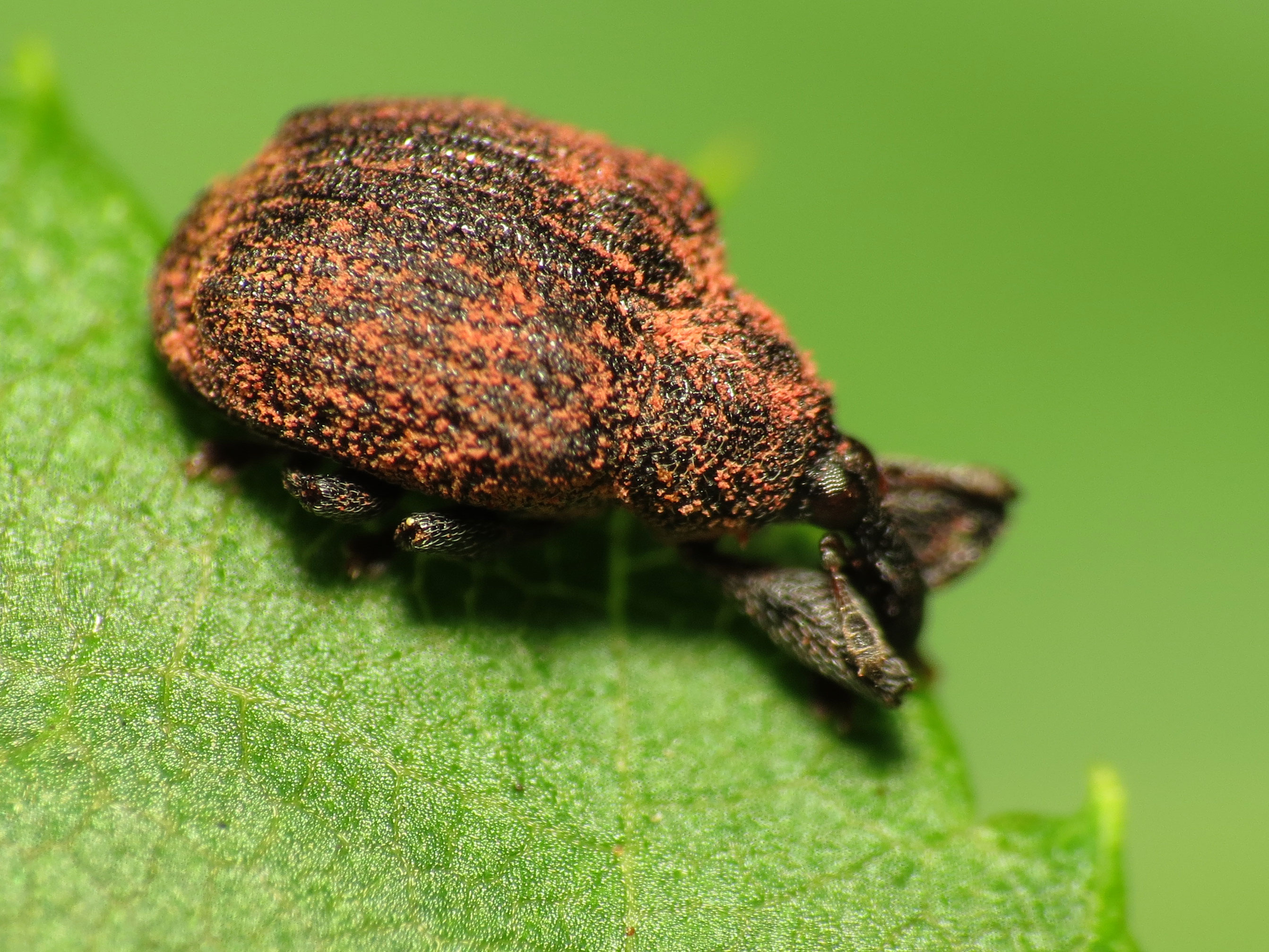

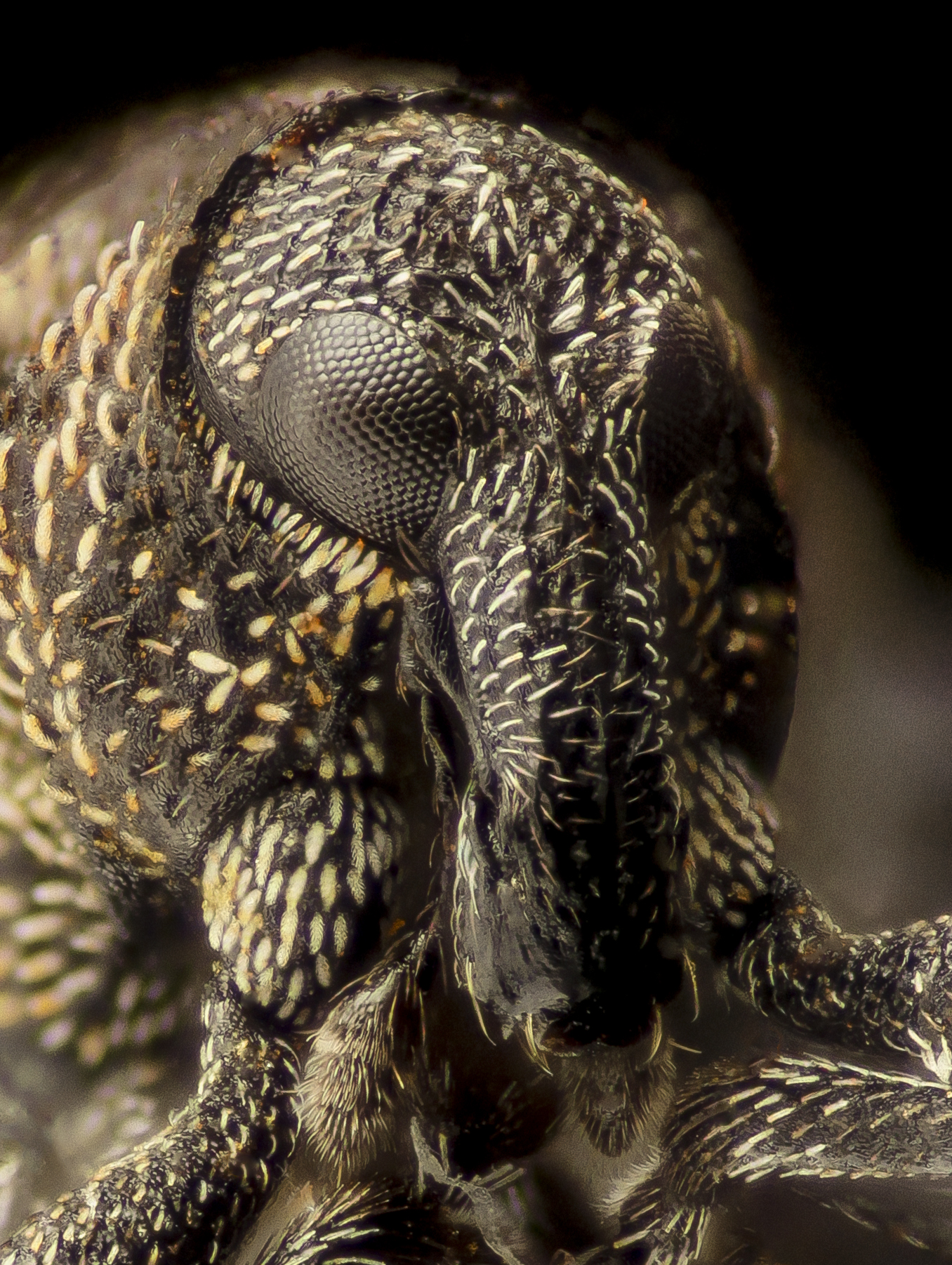
close-up of head

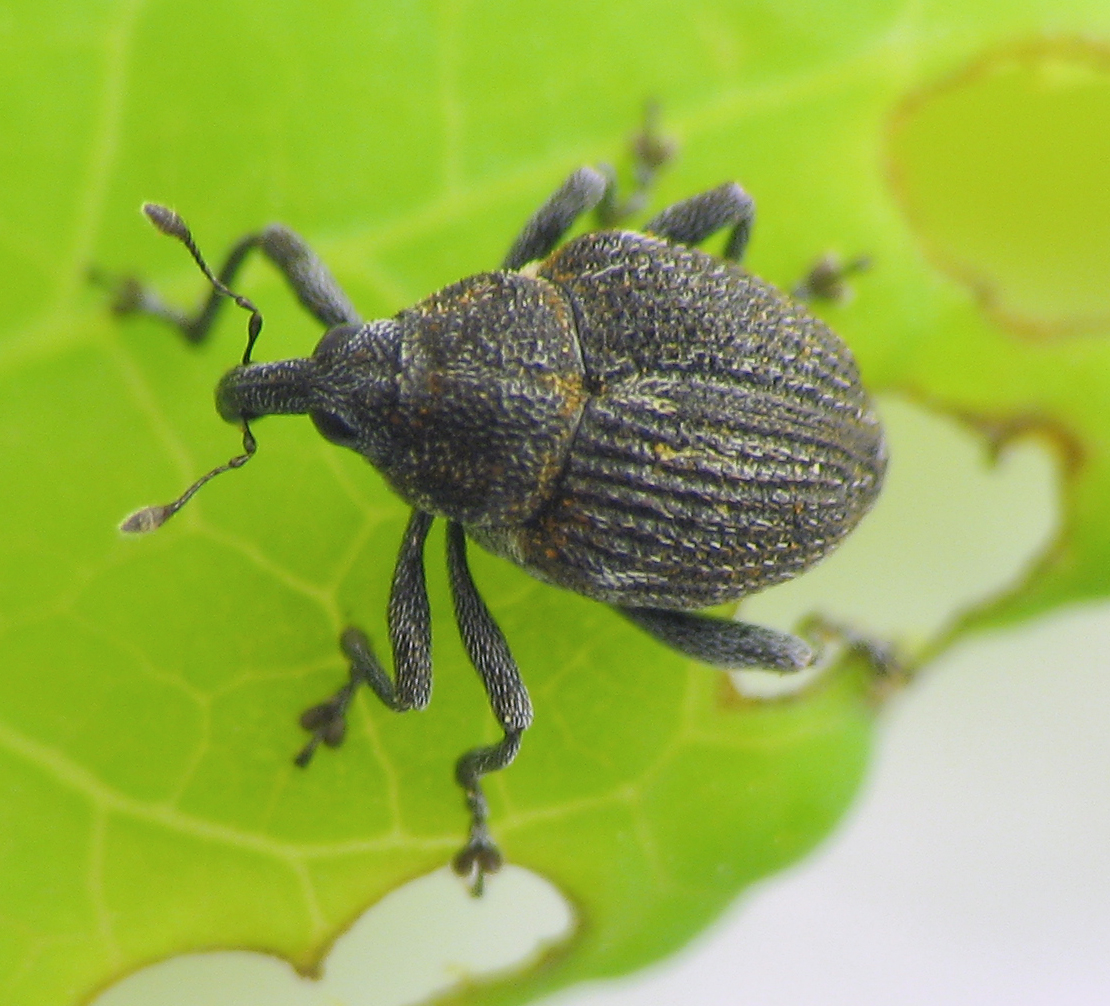
Recently emerged adult. It turns reddish orange from plant sap after feeding several days.
