= Euhrychiopsis =

Scientific classification
- Kingdom: Animalia
- Phylum: Arthropoda
- Class: Insecta
- Order: Coleoptera
- Suborder: Polyphaga
- Infraorder: Cucujiformia
- Family: Curculionidae
- Subfamily: Ceutorhynchinae
- Tribe: Phytobiini
- Genus: Euhrychiopsis; Dietz, 1896

species
- Euhrychiopsis lecontei

Genus of beetles

Euhrychiopsis is a weevil genus in the tribe Phytobiini.
