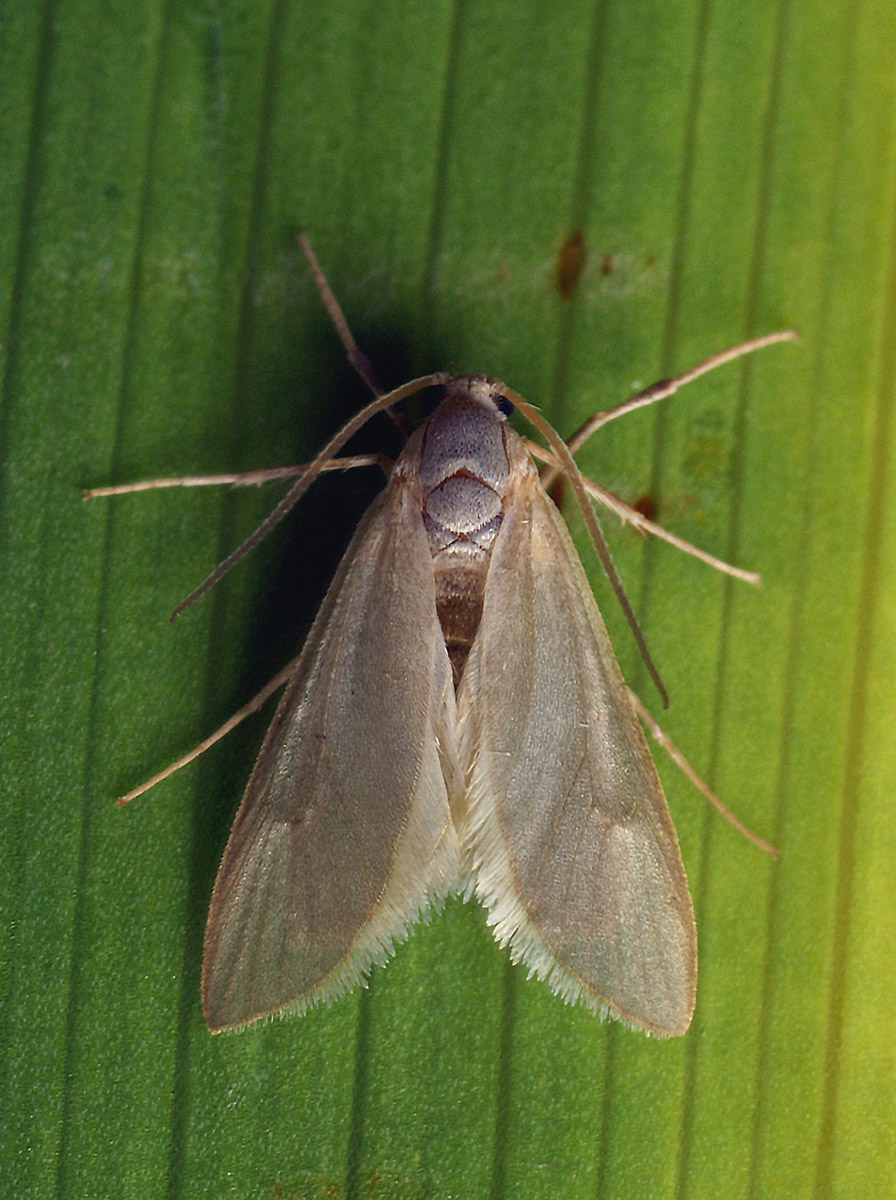

Scientific classification
- Kingdom: Animalia
- Phylum: Arthropoda
- Clade: Pancrustacea
- Class: Insecta
- Order: Lepidoptera
- Family: Crambidae
- Subfamily: Acentropinae
- Genus: Acentria; Stephens, 1829
- Species: A. ephemerella

Binomial name
- Acentria ephemerella Denis & Schiffermüller, 1775

Synonyms
- Genus; Acentropus J. Curtis, 1834; Setina Hübner, 1819; Zancle Stephens, 1833; Species; Acentria nivea; Acentria niveus; Tinea ephemerella Denis & Schiffermüller, 1775; Acentropus badensis Nolcken, 1869; Acentropus garnonsii J. Curtis, 1834; Acentropus germanicus Nolcken, 1869; Acentropus latipennis Möschler, 1860; Acentropus nevae obscurus Tengström, 1869; Acentropus newae Kolenati, 1858; Bombyx phryganea Hübner, 1809; Bombyx sembris Hübner, 1809; Zancle hansoni Stephens, 1833; Phryganea nivea G.-A. Olivier, 1791; Phryganea nivosa Stephens, 1834; Setina ephemera Hübner, 1819

= Acentria =

Genus of moths

Acentria is a monotypic genus of moth of the family Crambidae that was described by James Francis Stephens in 1829. Its only species, Acentria ephemerella, the watermilfoil moth or water veneer, was described by Michael Denis and Ignaz Schiffermüller in 1775. It is used as an agent of biological pest control against the noxious aquatic plant known as Eurasian watermilfoil (Myriophyllum spicatum).

The adult male is a white moth with a wingspan of about 12 millimeters. Forewings whitish, veins and costa obscurely brownish. Hindwings whitish. Wings in female often rudimentary, but sometimes larger than in male, up to 23 mm. Larva light olive-green; head light brown.

The development of the wings of the female appears to vary considerably, but under what circumstances is still uncertain. There are two female morphologies. Most females are flightless and live on the surface of the water or just submersed. A few females have longer wings and fly. This is an aquatic insect; most of its life cycle takes place in the water. The female is fertilized at the surface and dives to lay egg masses on aquatic plants, such as Potamogeton spp., Canadian waterweed Elodea canadensis and watermilfoil. The larva emerges and bores into the stem of the plant, gluing together plant material to create a shelter. It girdles stems as it feeds, which causes significant damage to the plant as stems and leaves die or break off. The larva pupates inside an underwater cocoon filled with air. Upon emergence, males and flighted females swim to the water surface and fly away.

This moth is used as a biocontrol agent on watermilfoil, but carefully, because it lacks host specificity and will attack other plant species, including natives. It tends to prefer M. spicatum over other plants. This is a European moth, but it was found in Canada in the 1920s, having been probably introduced accidentally. It is established in much of the northeastern United States, where it appears to have the ability to reduce watermilfoil infestations.

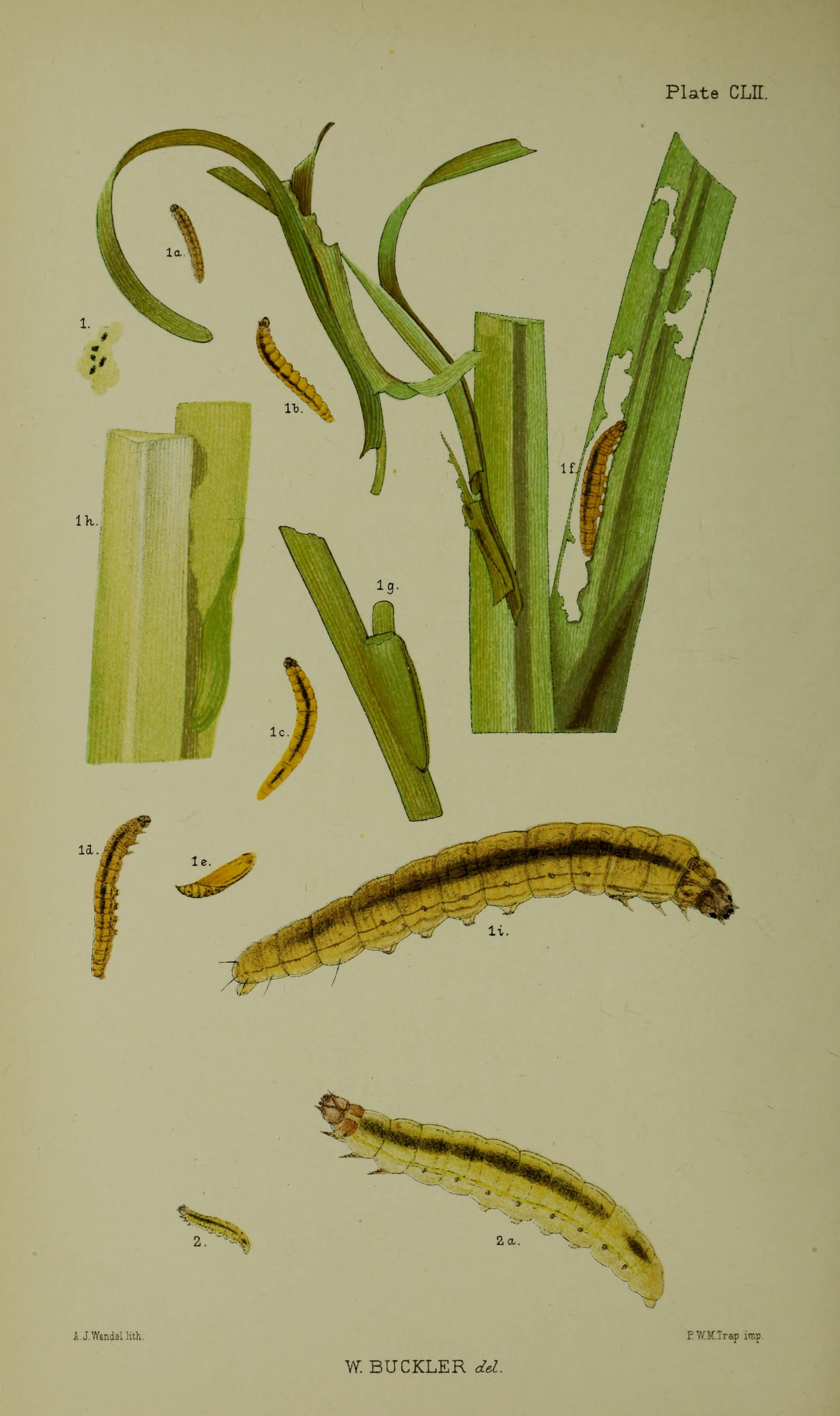
Figs. 2 larva after final moult 2a same highly magnified

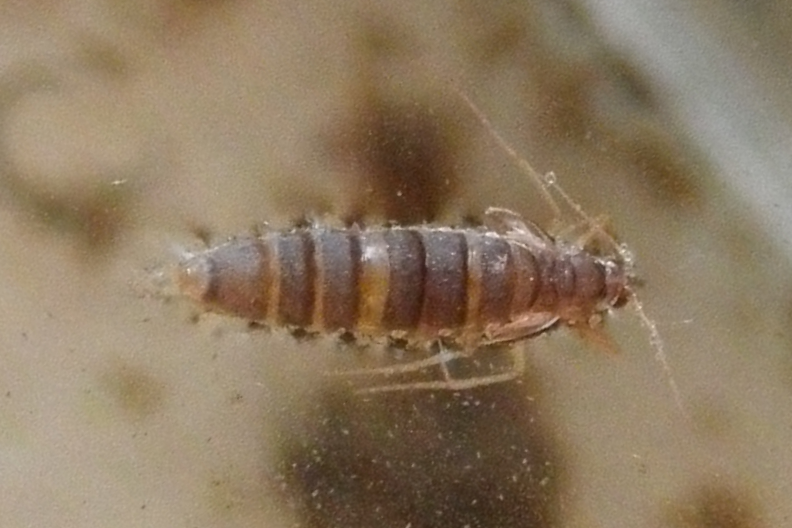
Wingless female
