= Euhrychiopsis lecontei =

Scientific classification
- Kingdom: Animalia
- Phylum: Arthropoda
- Class: Insecta
- Order: Coleoptera
- Suborder: Polyphaga
- Infraorder: Cucujiformia
- Family: Curculionidae
- Genus: Euhrychiopsis
- Species: E. lecontei

Binomial name
- Euhrychiopsis lecontei (Dietz, 1896)

Species of beetle

Euhrychiopsis lecontei, also known as the milfoil weevil, is a type of weevil that has been investigated as a potential biocontrol agent for Eurasian water milfoil. It is found in the eastern and central United States and western Canada.

== Life cycle ==
E. lecontei is a holometabolous insect, undergoing true metamorphosis. Development is temperature dependent, but the time to develop from eggs to larvae is about 4 days, from larvae to pupae 13 days, and from pupae to adults 13 days. Larvae are stem borers and damage plant tissue from about 7 cm (2.8 in) from the tip of the plant.

== Use in biocontrol ==
Milfoil weevils occur in natural populations in much of North America on their native host, northern watermilfoil (Myriophyllum sibiricum). They often reach sufficient densities to suppress invasive Eurasian watermilfoil (Myriophyllum spicatum) infestations after a prolonged infestation or artificial augmentation. Studies indicate that for effective control a density of about 1 weevil per two stems of milfoil (0.5 weevils per stem) is necessary. There are mixed reviews that fish such as bluegills can reduce weevil populations as research has only been conducted in very limited settings. Augmenting native weevil populations as a biological control is effective as long as there is a small amount of milfoil to sustain the population. Milfoil weevils are commercially available as a management option for Eurasian water milfoil by a firm based in the United States and Canada.
