= Neophytobius cavifrons =

Scientific classification
- Kingdom: Animalia
- Phylum: Arthropoda
- Class: Insecta
- Order: Coleoptera
- Suborder: Polyphaga
- Infraorder: Cucujiformia
- Family: Curculionidae
- Genus: Neophytobius
- Species: N. cavifrons

Binomial name
- Neophytobius cavifrons (LeConte, 1876)

Synonyms
- Pelenomus torvipes Dietz, 1896

Species of beetle

Neophytobius cavifrons is a species of minute seed weevil in the beetle family Curculionidae. It is found in North America.
