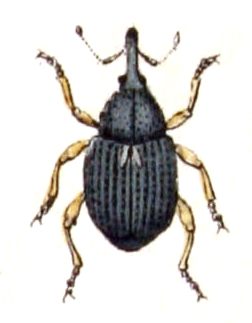
- Rhinoncus pericarpius

Scientific classification
- Kingdom: Animalia
- Phylum: Arthropoda
- Class: Insecta
- Order: Coleoptera
- Suborder: Polyphaga
- Infraorder: Cucujiformia
- Family: Curculionidae
- Tribe: Phytobiini
- Genus: Rhinoncus; Schönherr, 1825

Synonyms
- List: Amalorhinoncus Wagner, 1936; Amalorrhynchus Colonnelli, 1979; Campilirhynchus Gyllenhal, 1837; Campilyrhynchus Villa & Villa, 1844; Camplirhinchus Gistl, 1829; Campylorhynchus Agassiz, 1846; Compylirhynchus Hummel, 1823; Cryptorhis Billberg, 1820; Cryptorhynchus Latreille, 1810; Pachylorhynchus Dejean, 1821; Rhinonchus Stephens, 1833; Rhinoncus Winkler, 1930; Rhinoneus Gistel, 1848

= Rhinoncus =

Genus of beetles

Rhinoncus is a genus of weevils in the family Curculionidae. Species feed on plants of the knotweed family Polygonaceae.

== Species ==
The following species are recognised in the genus Rhinoncus:

- Rhinoncus albicinctus Gyllenhal, 1837
- Rhinoncus albocinctus Sainte-Claire Deville, 1938
- Rhinoncus asperulatus Hustache, 1938
- Rhinoncus asperulus O'Brien & Wibmer, 1982
- Rhinoncus australis Oke, 1931
- Rhinoncus autumnalis Korotyaev, 1980
- Rhinoncus bosnicus Schultze, 1900
- Rhinoncus bruchoides (J.F.W.Herbst, 1784)
- Rhinoncus buyssoni Hoffmann, 1955
- Rhinoncus caesareus Colonnelli, 1979
- Rhinoncus canaliculatus Stephens, 1837
- Rhinoncus castaneus Hustache, 1916
- Rhinoncus castor Gyll., 1837
- Rhinoncus castor Stephens, 1829
- Rhinoncus chinensis Schultze, 1901
- Rhinoncus congenialis O'Brien & Wibmer, 1982
- Rhinoncus conjectus Gyll., 1837
- Rhinoncus crassus Stephens, 1831
- Rhinoncus cribricollis Hustache, 1916
- Rhinoncus denticollis Gyll., 1837
- Rhinoncus deplanatus Hustache, 1938
- Rhinoncus erythrocneme Beck., 1817
- Rhinoncus flavipes Stephens, 1829
- Rhinoncus formosanus Korotyaev, 1997
- Rhinoncus fruticulosus
- Rhinoncus fukienensis Korotyaev, 1980
- Rhinoncus fuliginosus O'Brien & Wibmer, 1982
- Rhinoncus gentneri O'Brien & Wibmer, 1982
- Rhinoncus gracilipes O'Brien & Wibmer, 1982
- Rhinoncus gramineus Gyll., 1837
- Rhinoncus granulipennis Gyllenhal, 1837
- Rhinoncus gressitti Korotyaev, 1997
- Rhinoncus grypus Schoenherr, 1837
- Rhinoncus guttalis Gyll., 1837
- Rhinoncus henningsi Wagner, 1936
- Rhinoncus hovanus Hustache, 1920
- Rhinoncus inconspectus Gyll., 1837
- Rhinoncus inconspectus Stephens, 1829
- Rhinoncus interstitialis
- Rhinoncus jakovlevi Faust, 1893
- Rhinoncus kabakovi Korotyaev, 1980
- Rhinoncus kivuensis Hustache, 1939
- Rhinoncus koreanus Korotyaev, 1997
- Rhinoncus lanei O'Brien & Wibmer, 1982
- Rhinoncus leucostigma (Marsham, 1802)
- Rhinoncus longulus Lec., 1876
- Rhinoncus luteola Hust., 1920
- Rhinoncus luzonicus Hustache, 1925
- Rhinoncus lysholmi Pic, 1896
- Rhinoncus margaritae Korotyaev, 1997
- Rhinoncus minutus Korotyaev, 1980
- Rhinoncus mongolicus Reitt., 1895
- Rhinoncus montanus Hoffmann, 1960
- Rhinoncus nigriventris Pascoe, 1873
- Rhinoncus nigrotibialis Wagner, 1939
- Rhinoncus notula C.G.Thoms., 1865
- Rhinoncus oblongus Hustache, 1922
- Rhinoncus obscurefasciatus O'Brien & Wibmer, 1982
- Rhinoncus occidentalis Dietz, 1896
- Rhinoncus paganus Gyll., 1837
- Rhinoncus parvulus Korotyaev, 1981
- Rhinoncus pericarpius (C.Linnaeus, 1758)
- Rhinoncus perpendicularis (G.C.Reich, 1797)
- Rhinoncus picipennis Hust., 1920
- Rhinoncus planipennis Colonnelli, 1979
- Rhinoncus pusillus O'Brien & Wibmer, 1982
- Rhinoncus pyrrhopus Boheman, 1845
- Rhinoncus pyrrhopus Hatch & Kincaid, 1958
- Rhinoncus quadricornis Stephens, 1831
- Rhinoncus quadrinodosus C.G.Thoms., 1865
- Rhinoncus quadrituberculatus Stephens, 1831
- Rhinoncus rubricus Pic, 1896
- Rhinoncus rufescens Stephens, 1831
- Rhinoncus rufipes Stephens, 1831
- Rhinoncus rufofemoratus Schultze, 1901
- Rhinoncus sanguinipes Reitt., 1916
- Rhinoncus scabratus
- Rhinoncus scoliasus O'Brien & Wibmer, 1982
- Rhinoncus seniculus Grav., 1807
- Rhinoncus sibiricus Faust, 1893
- Rhinoncus smreczynskii Wagner, 1937
- Rhinoncus sparsesetosus Gyllenhal, 1837
- Rhinoncus spartii Stephens, 1831
- Rhinoncus spurius Rey, 1895
- Rhinoncus squamipennis O'Brien & Wibmer, 1982
- Rhinoncus squamosus O'Brien & Wibmer, 1982
- Rhinoncus stigma Aurivillius, 1926
- Rhinoncus subfasciatus Schoenherr, 1837
- Rhinoncus sulcicollis Boheman, 1845
- Rhinoncus sulcipennis Schultze, 1898
- Rhinoncus suturalis
- Rhinoncus tibialis Hoffmann, 1955
- Rhinoncus triangularis (Say & T., 1832)
- Rhinoncus uchidai Kôno, 1935
- Rhinoncus ventralis O'Brien & Wibmer, 1982
