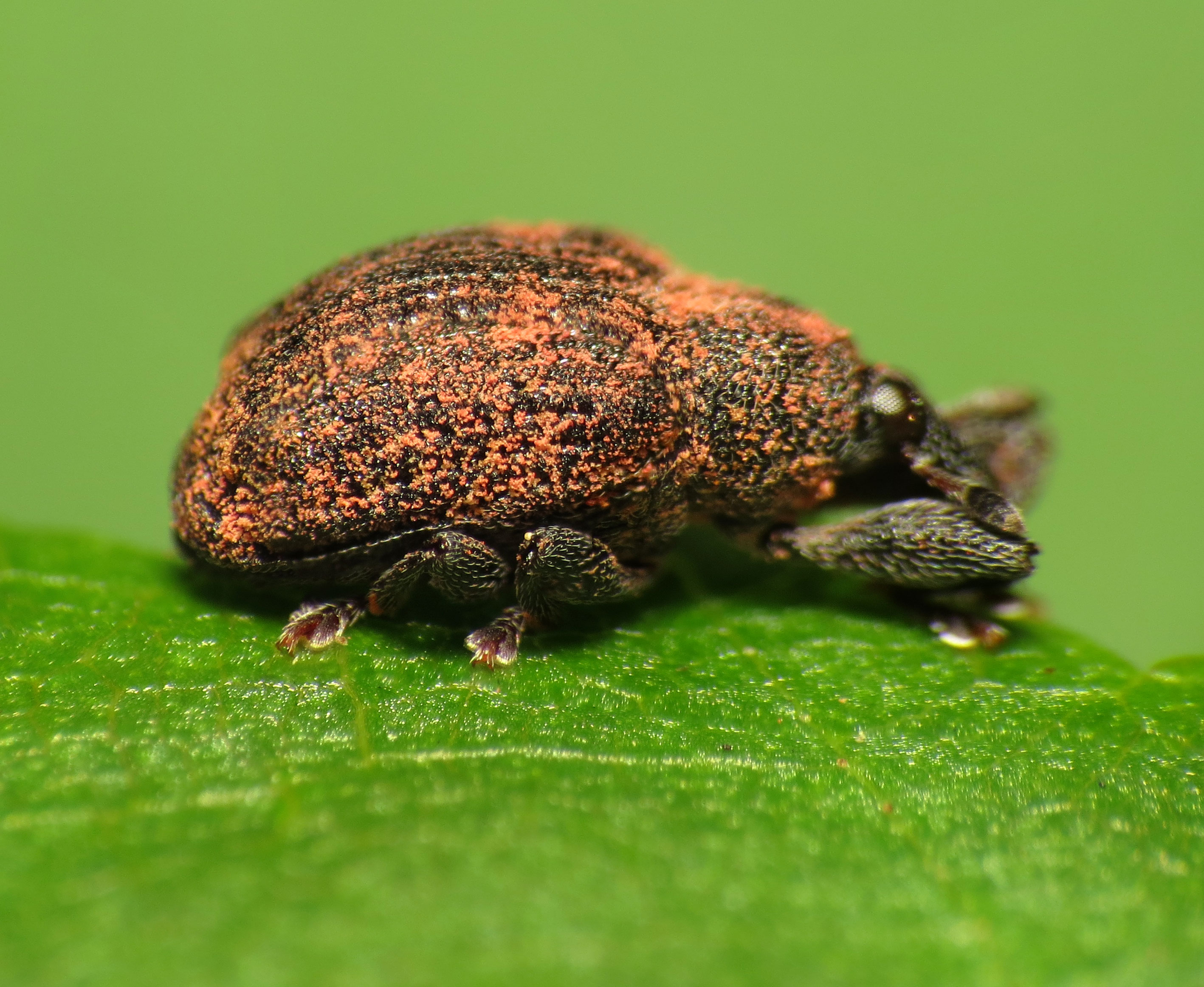
- Rhinoncomimus latipes

Scientific classification
- Domain: Eukaryota
- Kingdom: Animalia
- Phylum: Arthropoda
- Class: Insecta
- Order: Coleoptera
- Suborder: Polyphaga
- Infraorder: Cucujiformia
- Family: Curculionidae
- Tribe: Phytobiini
- Genus: Rhinoncomimus; Wagner, 1940

= Rhinoncomimus =

Genus of beetles

Rhinoncomimus is a genus of minute seed weevils in the family of beetles known as Curculionidae. There are about eight described species in Rhinoncomimus.

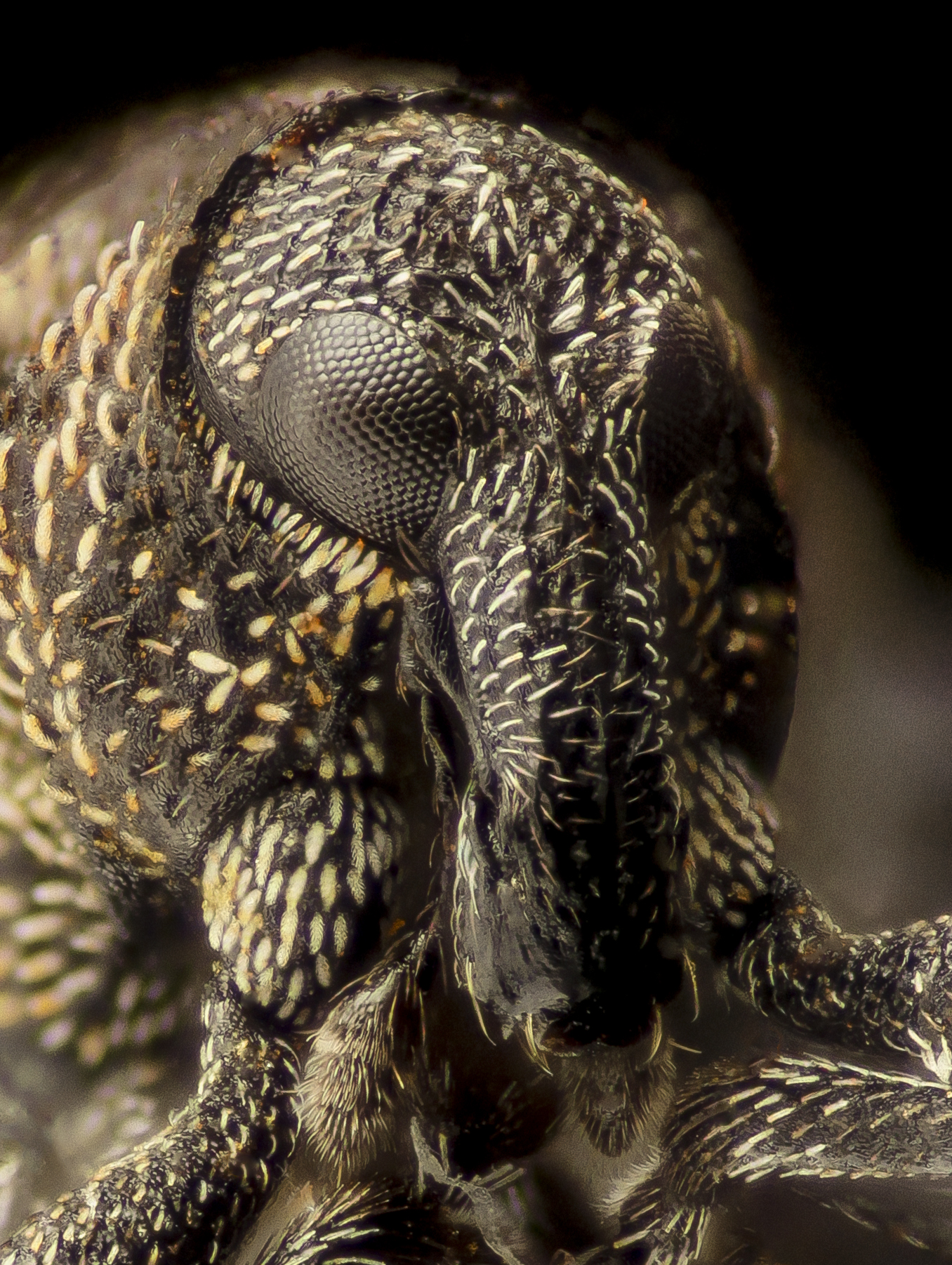
Rhinoncomimus latipes

== Species ==
These eight species belong to the genus Rhinoncomimus:

- Rhinoncomimus continuus Huang, Yoshitake & Zhang, 2013^{c g}
- Rhinoncomimus fukienensis Wagner, 1940^{c}
- Rhinoncomimus klapperichi Wagner, 1940^{c}
- Rhinoncomimus latipes Korotyaev^{c b} (mile-a-minute weevil)
- Rhinoncomimus niger Chûjô & Morimoto, 1959^{c}
- Rhinoncomimus rhytidosomoides Korotyaev, 1997^{c g}
- Rhinoncomimus robustus Voss, 1958^{c}
- Rhinoncomimus rubripes Korotyaev, 2006^{c}

Data sources: i = ITIS, c = Catalogue of Life, g = GBIF, b = Bugguide.net
