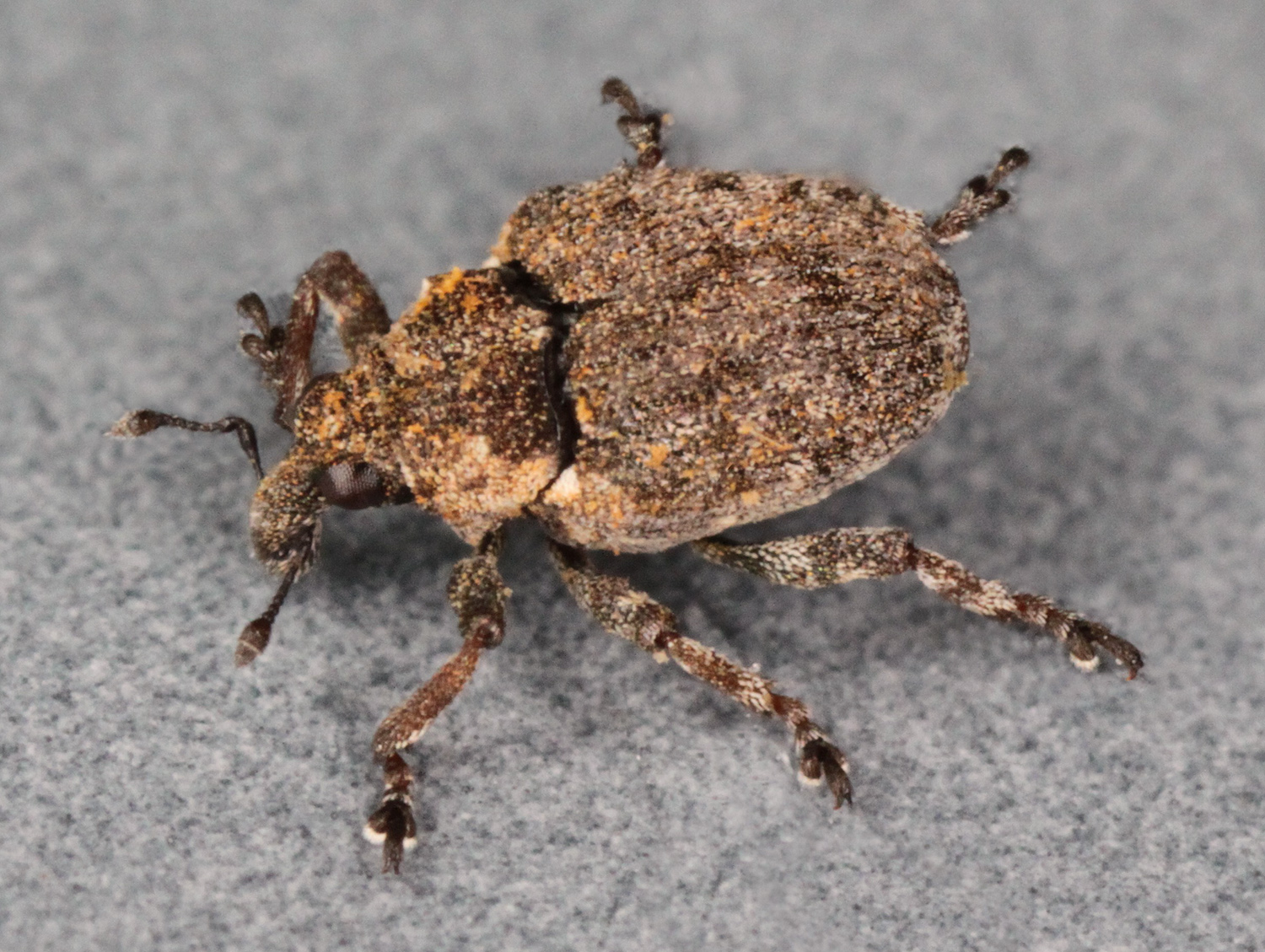
- Phytobius olssoni

Scientific classification
- Kingdom: Animalia
- Phylum: Arthropoda
- Class: Insecta
- Order: Coleoptera
- Suborder: Polyphaga
- Infraorder: Cucujiformia
- Family: Curculionidae
- Genus: Phytobius; Schönherr, 1833

Synonyms
- Lytodactylus Motschulsky, 1870; Perenthes Dietz, 1896; Perenthis Dietz, 1896

= Phytobius =

Genus of beetles

Phytobius is a genus of beetles belonging to the family Curculionidae.

== Species ==
The following species are recognised in the genus Phytobius:

- Phytobius albertanus Brown, 1932
- Phytobius astracanicus Schultze, 1903
- Phytobius brisouti Seidllitz, 1887-91
- Phytobius canaliculatus Fåhrs., 1883
- Phytobius chaffanjoni Hustache, 1916
- Phytobius comari Schoenherr, 1835
- Phytobius confusus Desbr., 1897-98
- Phytobius cuprifer Motsch., 1845
- Phytobius denticollis Schultze, 1898
- Phytobius egorovi Korotyaev, 1980
- Phytobius facialis Voss, 1952
- Phytobius femoralis Hoffmann, 1955
- Phytobius friebi Wagner, 1939
- Phytobius fuscus Kolen., 1859
- Phytobius granatus Gyll., 1836
- Phytobius griseomicans Schwarz, 1892
- Phytobius hartmanni Schultze, 1901
- Phytobius hydrophilus Laboulbène, 1849
- Phytobius hygrophilus Hustache, 1924
- Phytobius inaequalis Schoenherr, 1843
- Phytobius japonicus Roelofs, 1875
- Phytobius jarrigei Roudier, 1957
- Phytobius kozlovi Korotyaev, 1990
- Phytobius leucogaster (Marsham, 1802)
- Phytobius leucogaster Gyll., 1836
- Phytobius leucogaster Schoenherr, 1835
- Phytobius mixtus Hustache, 1922
- Phytobius mucronulatus Germ., 1823
- Phytobius muricatus Ch.Bris., 1867
- Phytobius myriophylli Gyll., 1836
- Phytobius nigrofemoralis Marcu, 1951
- Phytobius notula Schoenherr, 1835
- Phytobius olssoni Israelson, 1972
- Phytobius omissus Faust, 1887
- Phytobius paraguayanus Hustache, 1939
- Phytobius quadricornis Lameere, 1900
- Phytobius quadridentatus Schoenherr, 1835
- Phytobius quadrinodosus Schoenherr, 1835
- Phytobius quadrispinosus 1859
- Phytobius quadrituberculatus J.C.Fabricius, 1801
- Phytobius roelofsi Hustache, 1916
- Phytobius rufescens Schoenherr, 1835
- Phytobius rufipes Colonnelli, 1986
- Phytobius sachalinensis Korotyaev, 1980
- Phytobius squamipennis Sleeper, 1957
- Phytobius squamosus Lec., 1876
- Phytobius sulcicollis Fåhraeus, 1843
- Phytobius taschkenticus Faust, 1885
- Phytobius tibialis Rey, 1895
- Phytobius torvipes Dietz, 1896
- Phytobius variegatus Hustache, 1920
- Phytobius velaris Schoenherr, 1835
- Phytobius velatus Schoenherr, 1833
- Phytobius vtorovi Korotyaev, 1990
- Phytobius waltoni Boheman, 1843
- Phytobius wuorentausi Korotyaev, 1990
- Phytobius zumpti Wagner, 1939
