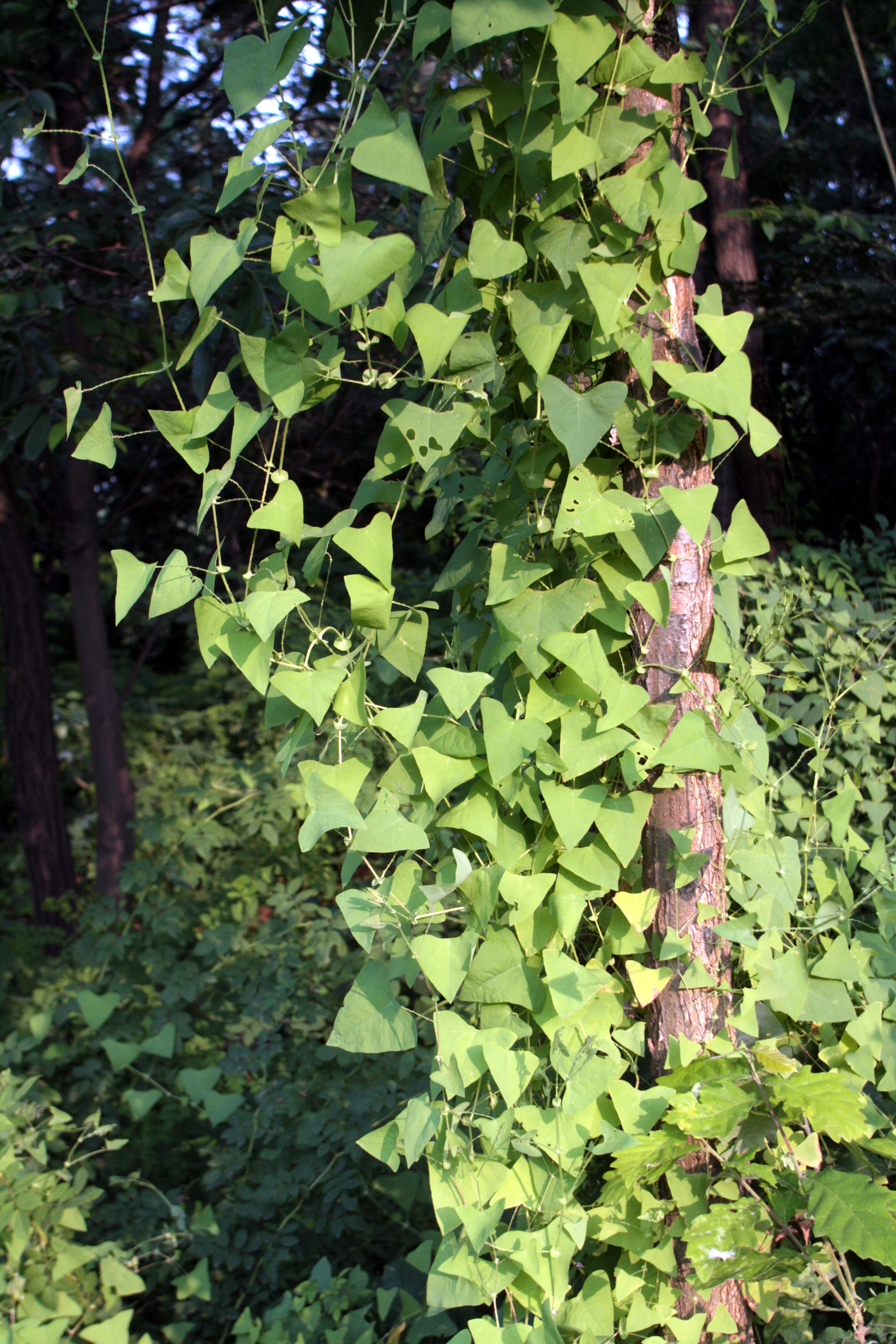

Scientific classification
- Kingdom: Plantae
- Clade: Tracheophytes
- Clade: Angiosperms
- Clade: Eudicots
- Order: Caryophyllales
- Family: Polygonaceae
- Genus: Persicaria
- Species: P. perfoliata

Binomial name
- Persicaria perfoliata (L.) H.Gross

Synonyms
- Ampelygonum perfoliatum (L.) Roberty & Vautier; Fagopyrum perfoliatum (L.) Raf.; Polygonum perfoliatum L.; Tracaulon perfoliatum (L.) Greene; Truellum perfoliatum (L.) Soják

= Persicaria perfoliata =

Species of flowering plant

Persicaria perfoliata (basionym Polygonum perfoliatum) is a species of flowering plant in the buckwheat family. Common names include mile-a-minute, devil's tail, giant climbing tearthumb, and Asiatic tearthumb. It is a trailing herbaceous annual vine with barbed stems and triangular leaves. It is native to most of temperate and tropical eastern Asia, occurring from eastern Russia and Japan in the north, and the range extending to the Philippines and India in the south.

P. perfoliata can be an aggressive, highly invasive weed outside of its native range. In Europe, Persicaria perfoliata is included since 2016 in the list of Invasive Alien Species of Union concern (the Union list). This implies that this species cannot be imported, cultivated, transported, commercialized, planted, or intentionally released into the environment in the whole of the European Union.

== Description ==
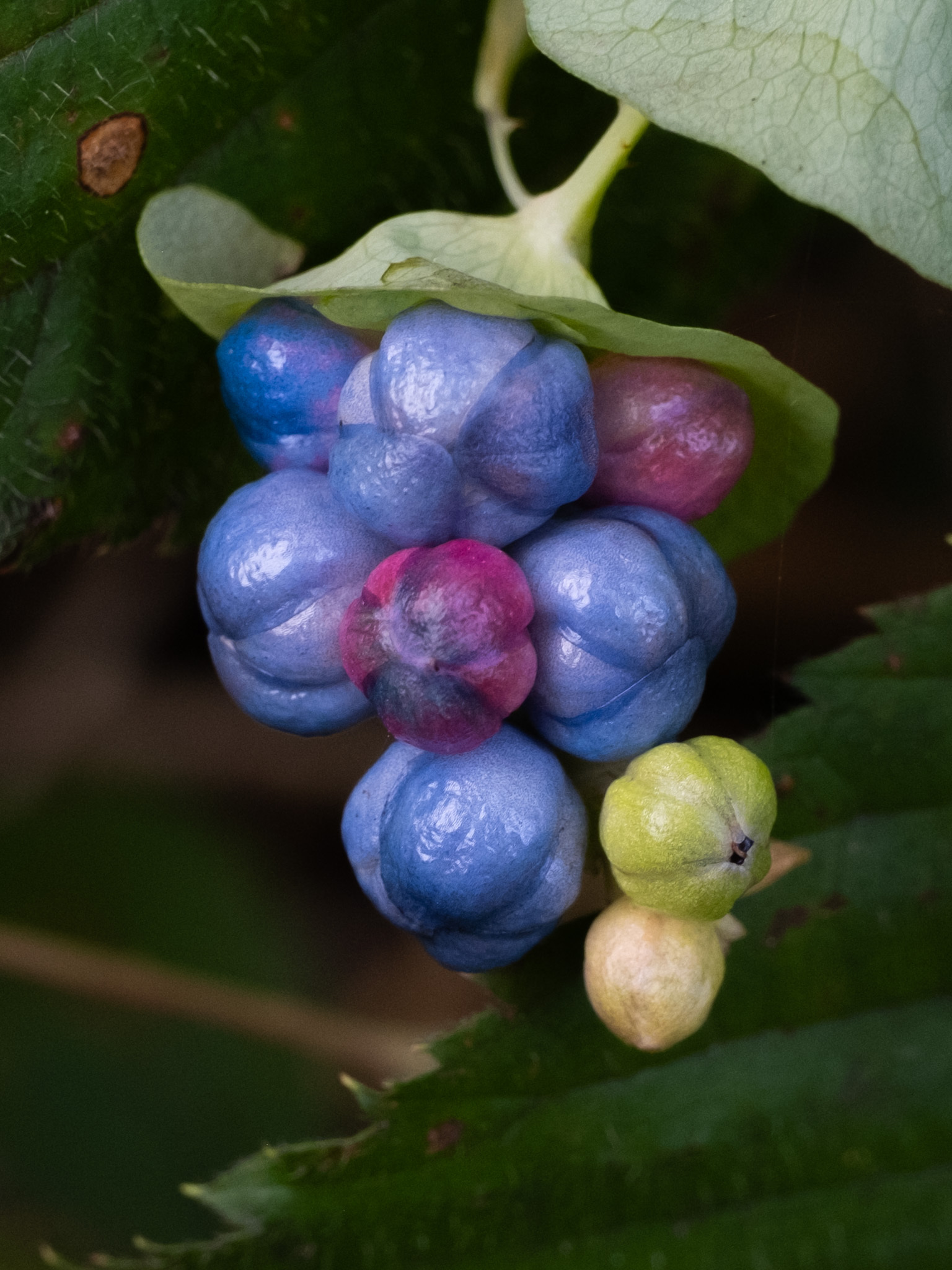
Fruit

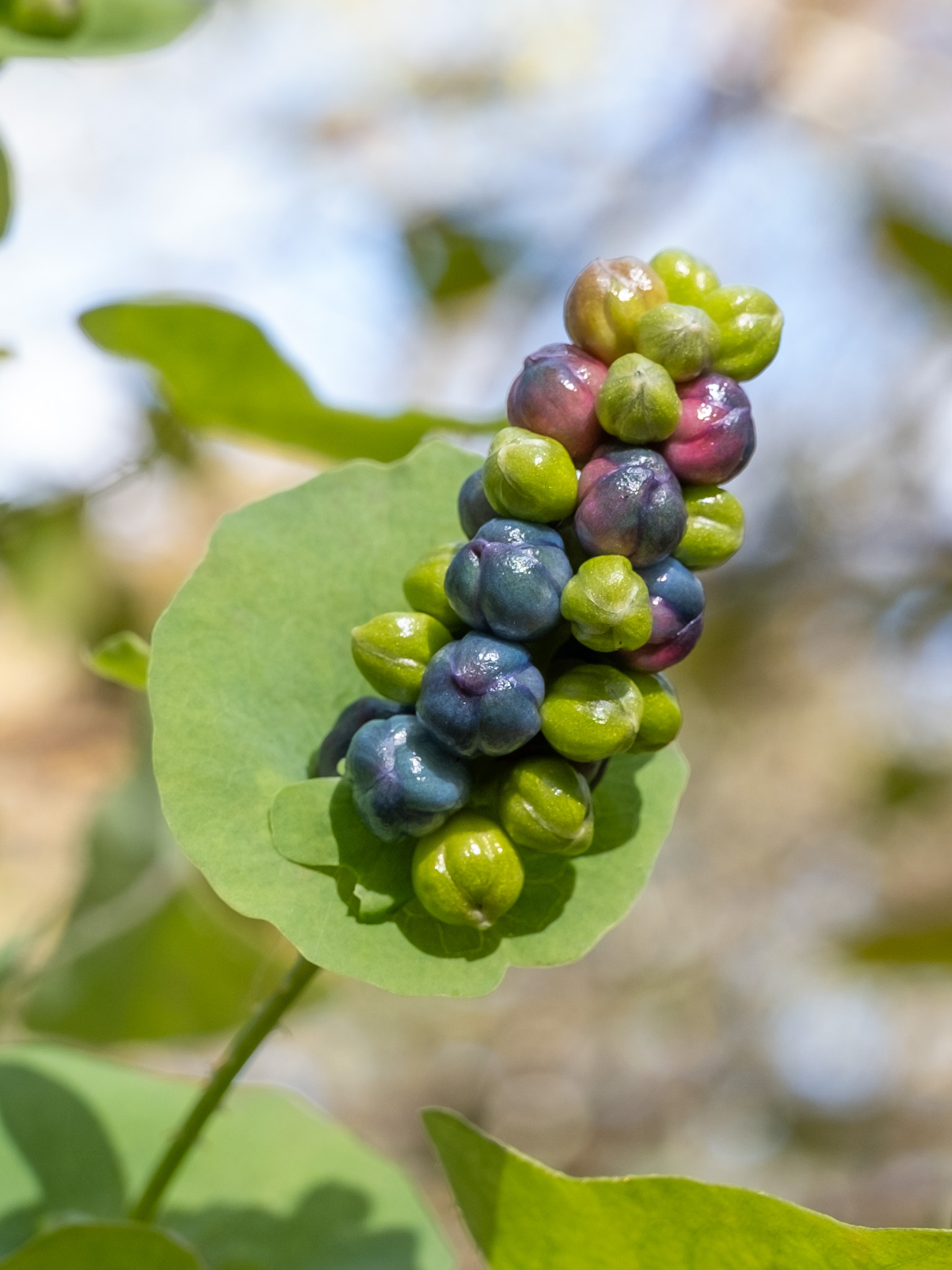
Mile-a-minute fruits changing color to from green, to pink, ultimately to blue

Persicaria perfoliata has a reddish stem that is armed with downward pointing hooks or barbs which are also present on the underside of the leaf blades. The light green leaves are shaped like an equilateral (equal-sided) triangle and alternate along the narrow, delicate stems. Distinctive circular, cup-shaped leafy structures, called ochreas, surround the stem at intervals.

Flower buds, and later flowers and fruits, emerge from within the ocreas. Flowers are small, white and generally inconspicuous. The edible fruits are attractive, metallic blue and segmented, each segment containing a single glossy, black or reddish-black seed.

== Habitat ==
Persicaria perfoliata prefers warm open areas, along the edges of woods, wetlands, stream banks, and roadsides, and uncultivated open fields, resulting from both natural and human causes, dense wooded areas where the overstory has opened up increasing the sunlight to the forest floor. Natural areas such as stream banks, parks, open space, road shoulders, forest edges and fence lines are all typical areas to find P. perfoliata. It also occurs in environments that are extremely wet with poor soil structure.

Available light and soil moisture are both integral to the successful colonization of this species. It will tolerate shade for a part of the day, but needs a good percentage, 63-100% of the available light. The ability of P. perfoliata to attach to other plants with its recurved barbs and climb over the plants to reach an area of high light intensity is a key to its survival. It can survive in areas with relatively low soil moisture, but demonstrates a preference for high soil moisture.

== Uses ==
In traditional Chinese medicine, Persicaria perfoliata is known as gangbangui (Chinese: 杠板归; pinyin: gāngbǎngūi), and is thought to be useful for various remedies in herbal medicine. It can also be used as a fiber or used in rope making.

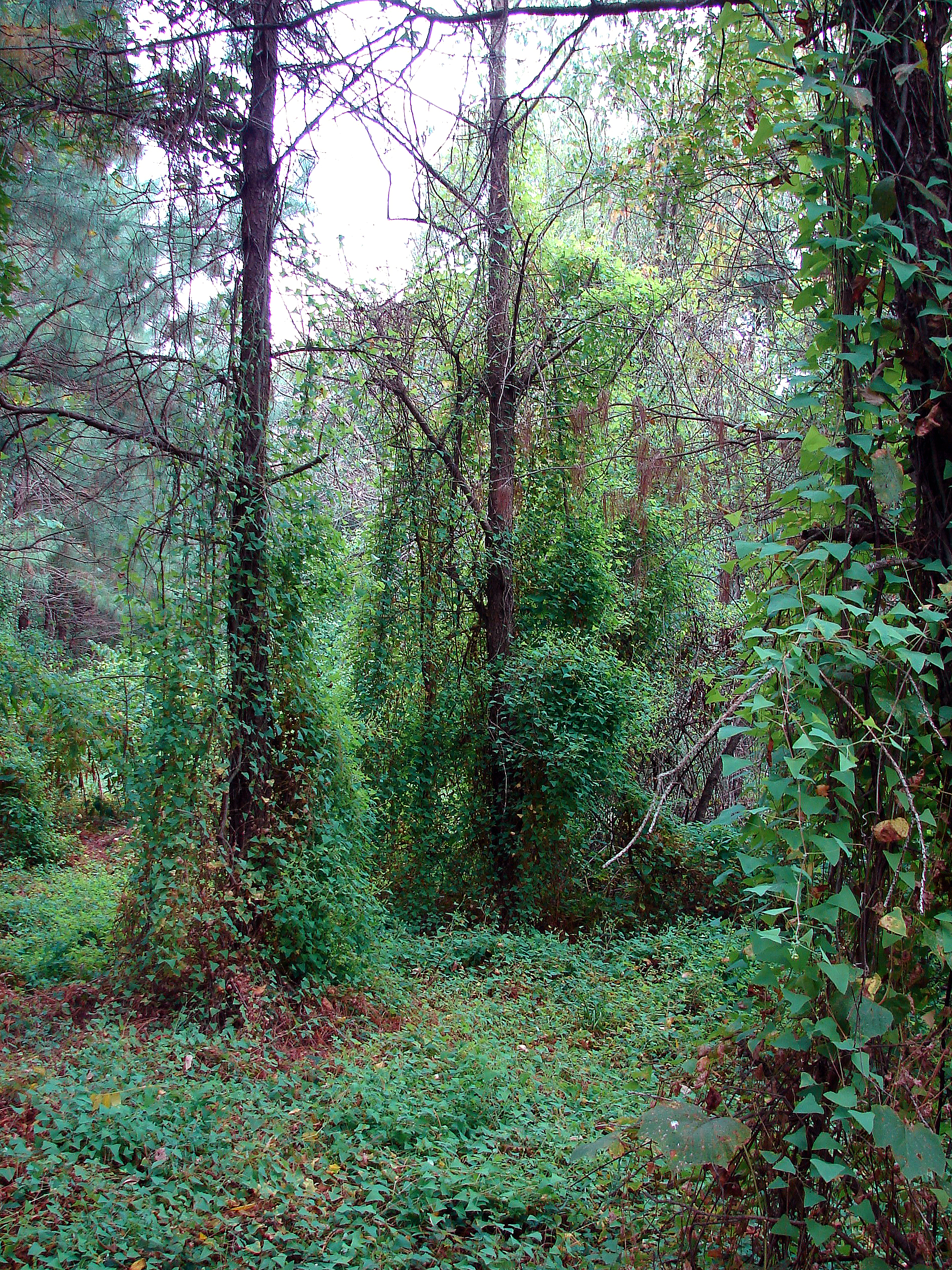
Persicaria perfoliata is a climbing vine.

=== Edibility ===
Persicaria perfoliata is an edible species. Its tender leaves and shoots can be eaten raw or cooked as a salad green or vegetable and its fruit can be eaten fresh.

== Introduction in the United States ==
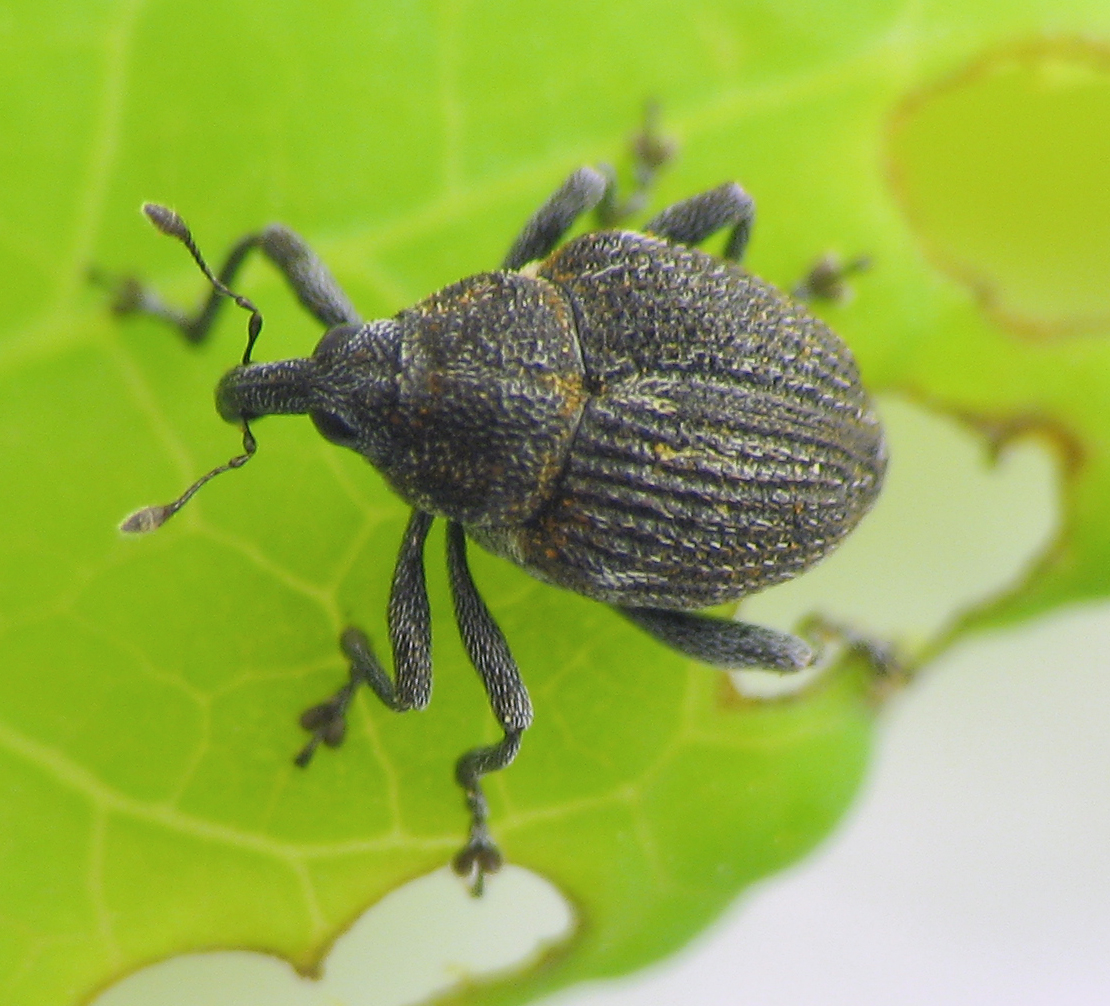
Rhinoncomimus latipes used as biocontrol.

The first records of Persicaria perfoliata in North America are from Portland, Oregon (1890), and Beltsville, Maryland (1937). Both of these sites were eliminated or did not establish permanent populations of the species.

However, the introduction of P. perfoliata somewhere between the late 1930s and 1946 to a nursery site in Stewartstown, York County, Pennsylvania, produced a population of this plant that did become established in the wild. It is speculated that the seed was spread with Rhododendron stock. Starting in 2004, the weevil Rhinoncomimus latipes has been introduced in eastern US to control this plant, with certain amount of success.

== Reproduction and propagation ==
Persicaria perfoliata is primarily a self-pollinating plant (supported by its inconspicuous, closed flowers with little scent), with occasional outcrossing. Fruits and viable seeds are produced without assistance from pollinators. Vegetative propagation from roots has not been successful for this plant. It is a very tender annual, withering with a slight frost, and reproduces successfully until the first frost. P. perfoliata is a prolific seeder, producing many seeds on a single plant over a long season, from June until October in Virginia, and a slightly shorter season in more northern geographic areas. It can cover as much as 30 feet (9.1 m) in a single season, maybe even more in the southern United States.

Birds are probably the primary long-distance dispersal agents of P. perfoliata. Transport of seeds over short distances by native ant species has been observed. This activity is probably encouraged by the presence of a tiny white food body (elaiosome) on the tip of the seed that may be attractive to the ants. These seed-carrying ants may play an important role in the survival and germination of the seeds of P. perfoliata. Local bird populations are important for dispersal under utility lines, bird feeders, fence lines and other perching locations. Other animals observed eating its fruits are chipmunks, squirrels and deer.

Water is also an important mode of dispersal. Its fruits can remain buoyant for 7–9 days, an important advantage for dispersing seed over long distances in stream and river environments. The long vines frequently hang over waterways, allowing fruits that detach to be carried away in the water current.

== Chemistry ==
Persicaria perfoliata contains phenylpropanoid esters such as 6'-acetyl-3,6-diferuloylsucrose (helonioside B), 2',4',6'-triacetyl-3,6-diferuloylsucrose, 1, 2',4',6'-tetraacetyl-3,6-diferuloylsucrose, 1,2',6'-triacetyl-3, 6-diferuloylsucrose, 2',6'-diacetyl-3,6-diferuloylsucrose, 1,3,6-tri-p-coumaroyl-6'-feruloylsucroses, vanicoside A and vanicoside B.
