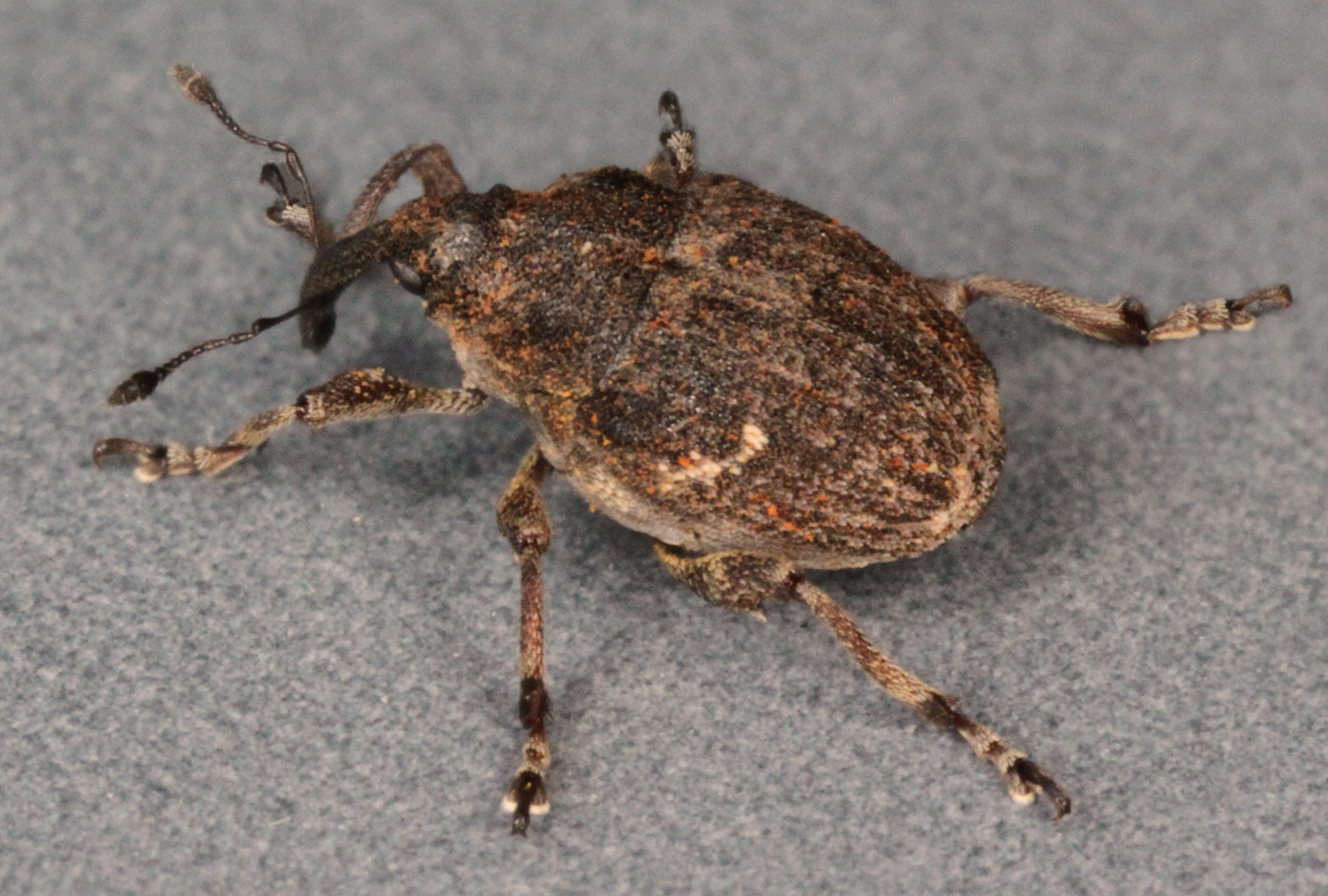
- Thamiocolus_viduatus, North Wales

Scientific classification
- Kingdom: Animalia
- Phylum: Arthropoda
- Class: Insecta
- Order: Coleoptera
- Suborder: Polyphaga
- Infraorder: Cucujiformia
- Family: Curculionidae
- Genus: Thamiocolus; Thomson, 1859

= Thamiocolus =

Genus of beetles

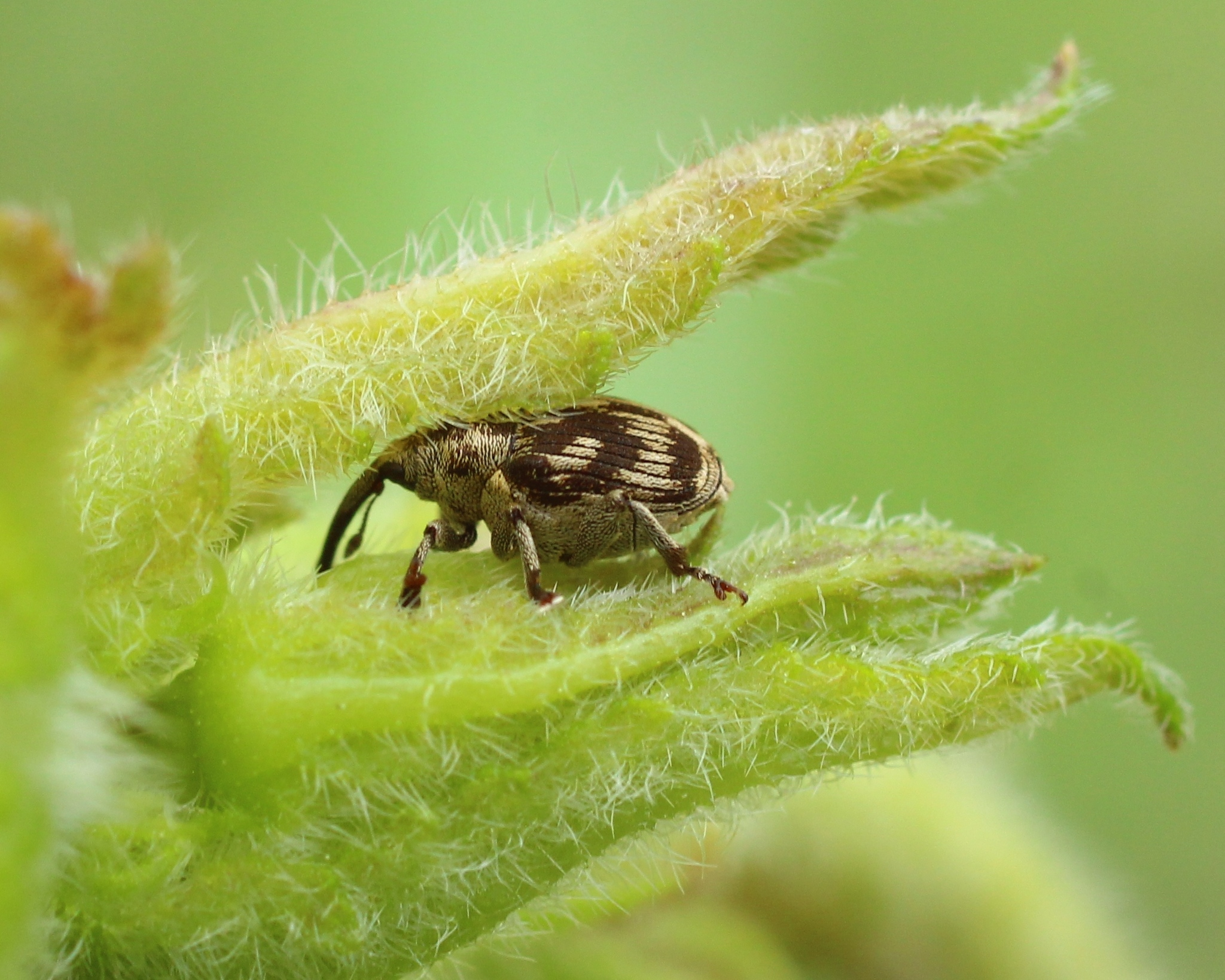
Thamiocolus virgatus, Russia

Thamiocolus is a genus of beetles belonging to the family Curculionidae.

The species of this genus are found mainly in Europe and western Asia.

== Species ==
These 42 species belong to the genus Thamiocolus:

- Thamiocolus albocruciatus Colonnelli, 1994
- Thamiocolus anthracinus Colonnelli, 2005
- Thamiocolus aprutinus Colonnelli, 2015
- Thamiocolus candioticus Dieckmann, 1973
- Thamiocolus chikatunovi Korotyaev & Friedman, 2020
- Thamiocolus comptus Colonnelli, 1997
- Thamiocolus dieckmanni Korotyaeva & Gultekin 2020
- Thamiocolus fausti Colonnelli, 1998
- Thamiocolus fischerianus Korotyaev, 1980
- Thamiocolus garajonay Stueben, 2014
- Thamiocolus gobicola Korotyaev, 1980
- Thamiocolus grancanariensis Stueben & Schuette, 2014
- Thamiocolus hamzai Korotyaeva & Gultekin 2020
- Thamiocolus hexatomus Colonnelli, 1997
- Thamiocolus kerzhneri Korotyaev, 1980
- Thamiocolus kirgisicus Korotyaev, 1980
- Thamiocolus kraatzi (Brisout de Barneville, 1869)
- Thamiocolus lodosi Korotyaev, 1995
- Thamiocolus longicornis Dieckmann, 1973
- Thamiocolus lopatini Korotyaev, 1980
- Thamiocolus marci Colonnelli, 2005
- Thamiocolus niveus (Chevrolat, 1859)
- Thamiocolus paravilis Dieckmann, 1973
- Thamiocolus phaleratus Colonnelli, 1997
- Thamiocolus pici Korotyaev, 1997
- Thamiocolus pubicollis (Gyllenhal, 1837)
- Thamiocolus roessleri Colonnelli, 1997
- Thamiocolus ronbali Dieckmann, 1973
- Thamiocolus ruitarsis Colonnelli, 2011
- Thamiocolus schneideri Colonnelli, 1998
- Thamiocolus signatus Stierl, 1904
- Thamiocolus signifer Colonnelli, 1994
- Thamiocolus sinapis (Desbrochers, 1893)
- Thamiocolus subulatus (Brisout de Barneville, 1869)
- Thamiocolus susannae Dieckmann, 1982
- Thamiocolus vaulogeri Colonnelli, 1981
- Thamiocolus viduatus (Gyllenhal, 1813)
- Thamiocolus virgatus (Gyllenhal, 1837)
- Thamiocolus volkovitshi Korotyaev, 1997
- Thamiocolus weisei Reitt, 1901
- Thamiocolus wittmeri Colonnelli, 1975
- Thamiocolus wollastoni Colonnelli, 1991
- Thamiocolus zaslavskii Korotyaev, 1980
