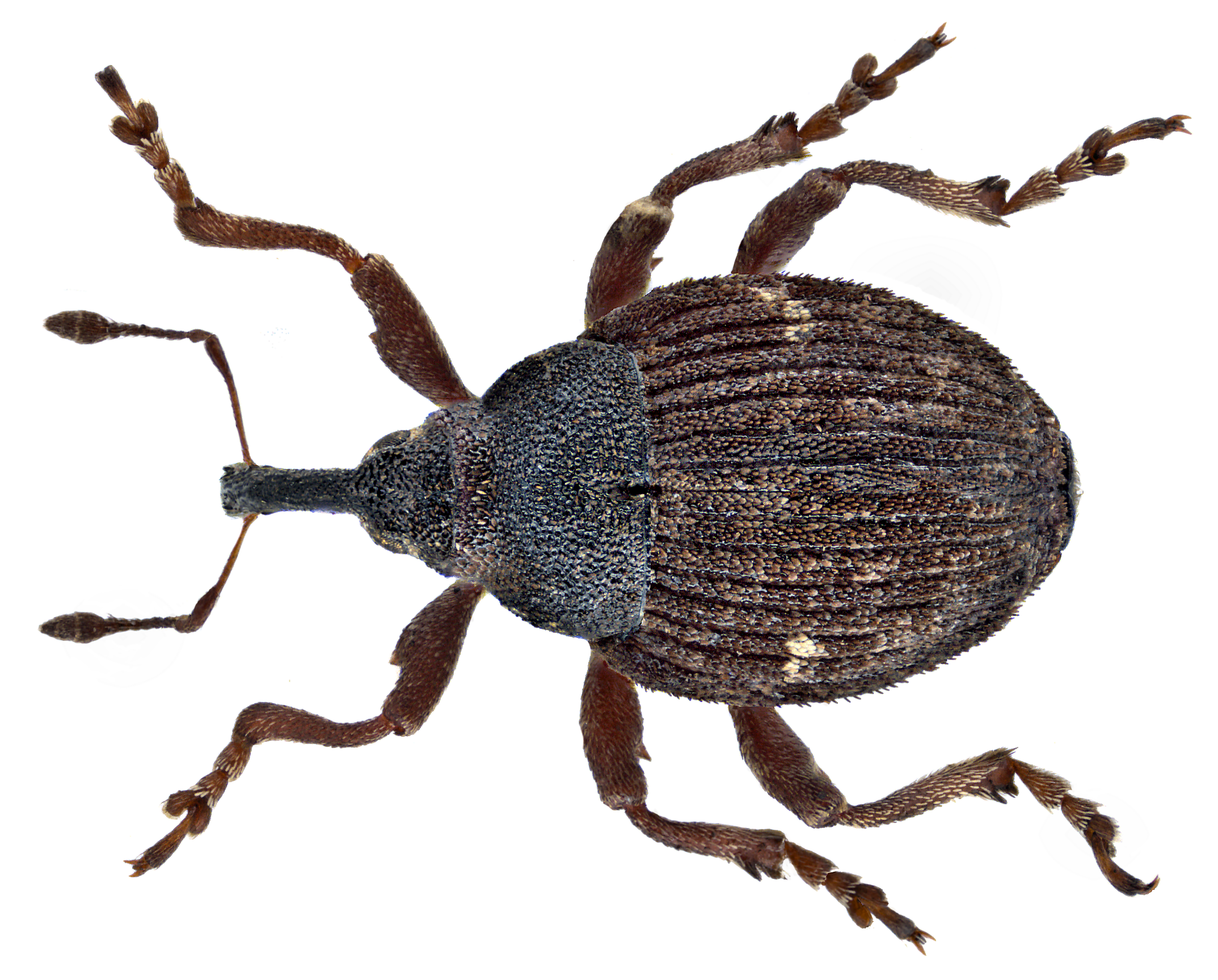
- Thamiocolus viduatus 3,4 mm (3,0-4,2 mm)

Scientific classification
- Kingdom: Animalia
- Phylum: Arthropoda
- Class: Insecta
- Order: Coleoptera
- Suborder: Polyphaga
- Infraorder: Cucujiformia
- Superfamily: Curculionoidea
- Family: Curculionidae
- Genus: Thamiocolus
- Species: T. viduatus

Binomial name
- Thamiocolus viduatus (Gyllenhal, 1813)

= Thamiocolus viduatus =

Species of beetle

Thamiocolus viduatus is a species of weevil native to Europe.
