= Nedyus flavicaudis =

Scientific classification
- Kingdom: Animalia
- Phylum: Arthropoda
- Class: Insecta
- Order: Coleoptera
- Suborder: Polyphaga
- Infraorder: Cucujiformia
- Family: Curculionidae
- Genus: Nedyus
- Species: N. flavicaudis

Binomial name
- Nedyus flavicaudis (Boheman, 1844)

Synonyms
- Coeliodes apicalis Dietz, 1896

Species of beetle

Nedyus flavicaudis is a species of minute seed weevil in the beetle family Curculionidae. It is found in North America.
