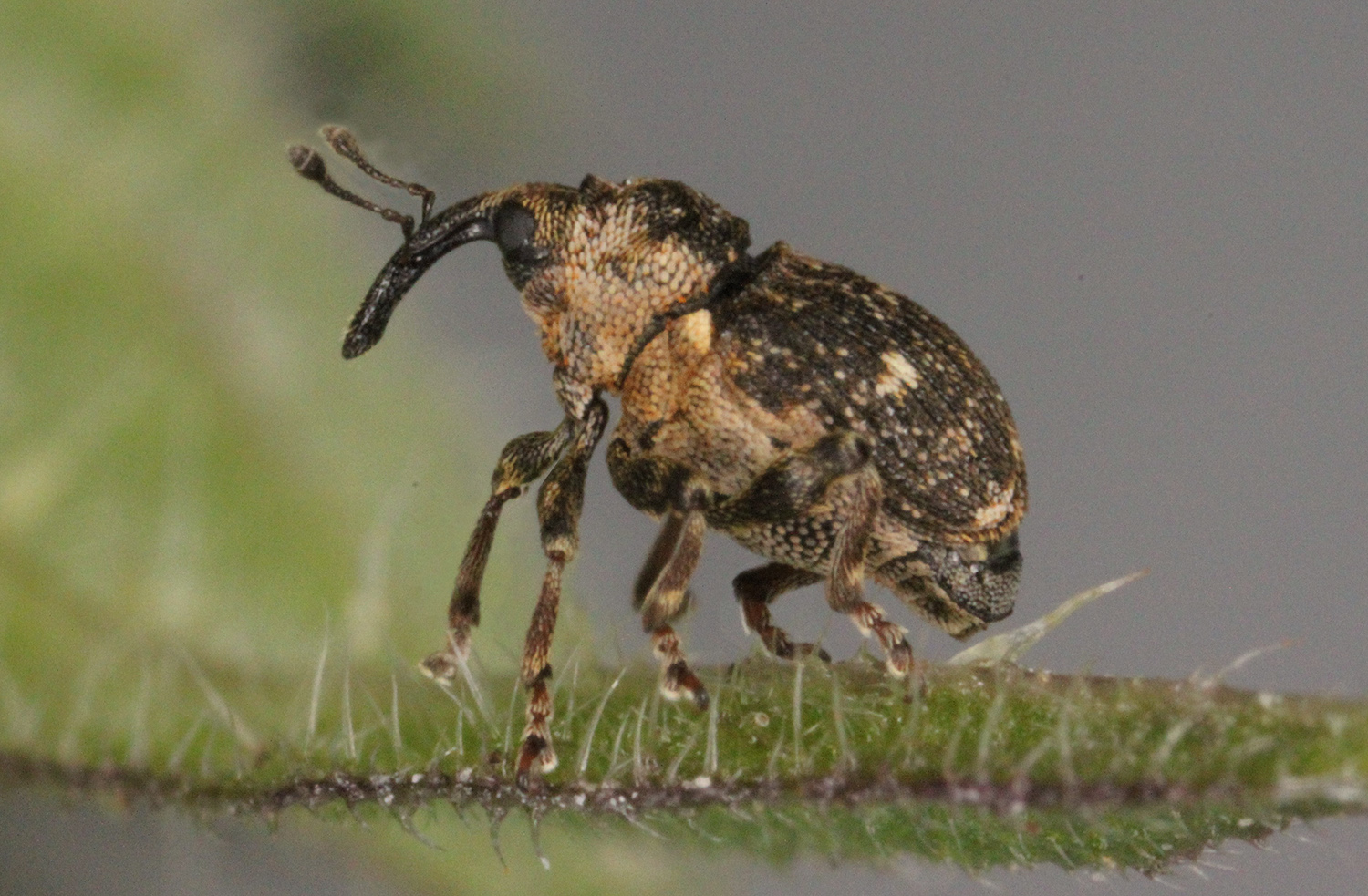
- Nedyus quadrimaculatus

Scientific classification
- Kingdom: Animalia
- Phylum: Arthropoda
- Class: Insecta
- Order: Coleoptera
- Suborder: Polyphaga
- Infraorder: Cucujiformia
- Family: Curculionidae
- Tribe: Ceutorhynchini
- Genus: Nedyus; Schönherr, 1825

= Nedyus =

Genus of beetles

Nedyus is a genus of minute seed weevils in the beetle family Curculionidae. There are more than 50 described species in Nedyus.

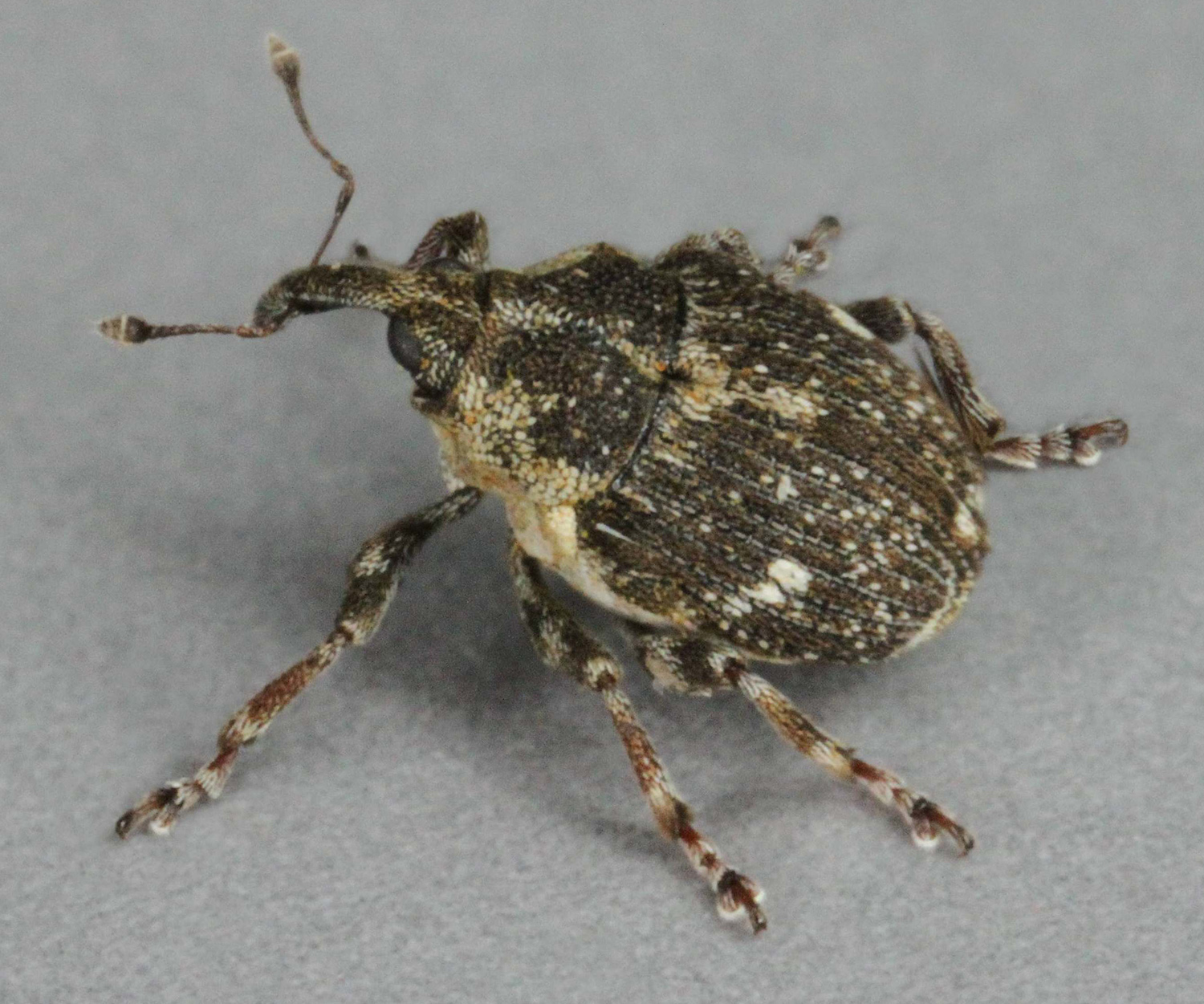
Nedyus quadrimaculatus

== Species ==
These 55 species belong to the genus Nedyus:

- Nedyus apicalis O'Brien & Wibmer, 1982
- Nedyus asperifoliarum Stephens, 1829
- Nedyus assimilis Stephens, 1829
- Nedyus atticus Colonnelli, 1994
- Nedyus borraginis Stephens, 1829
- Nedyus caliginosus Stephens, 1831
- Nedyus chloropterus Stephens, 1831
- Nedyus chrysanthemi Stephens, 1829
- Nedyus cinereus Stephens, 1829
- Nedyus cochleariae Stephens, 1831
- Nedyus constrictus Stephens, 1831
- Nedyus contractus Stephens, 1829
- Nedyus crux Stephens, 1829
- Nedyus depressicollis Stephens, 1829
- Nedyus detritus Stephens, 1829
- Nedyus didymus Schoenherr, 1825
- Nedyus distinctepubens Colonnelli, 1981
- Nedyus echii Stephens, 1829
- Nedyus ericae Stephens, 1829
- Nedyus erysimi Stephens, 1829
- Nedyus flavicaudis (Boheman, 1844)
- Nedyus floralis Stephens, 1831
- Nedyus horridus Stephens, 1831
- Nedyus leucomelanus Stephens, 1829
- Nedyus litura Stephens, 1829
- Nedyus marginatus Stephens, 1829
- Nedyus melanarius Stephens, 1829
- Nedyus melanostigma Stephens, 1829
- Nedyus monostigma Stephens, 1829
- Nedyus neophytus Faust, 1887
- Nedyus nigrinus Stephens, 1829
- Nedyus nigritus Stephens, 1831
- Nedyus obstrictus Stephens, 1829
- Nedyus ovalis Stephens, 1829
- Nedyus pallidactylus Stephens, 1829
- Nedyus phaeorhynchus Stephens, 1829
- Nedyus phaeorynchus Stephens, 1831
- Nedyus pollinarius Stephens, 1831
- Nedyus pusio Stephens, 1829
- Nedyus pyrrhorhynchus Stephens, 1831
- Nedyus quadrimaculatus (Linnaeus & C., 1758)
- Nedyus quercicola Stephens, 1831
- Nedyus rudis Pic, 1896
- Nedyus ruficrus Stephens, 1829
- Nedyus rugulosus Stephens, 1831
- Nedyus salicis
- Nedyus scutellatus Stephens, 1829
- Nedyus sisymbrii Stephens, 1829
- Nedyus spiniger Stephens, 1831
- Nedyus sulculus Stephens, 1831
- Nedyus suturalis Stephens, 1833
- Nedyus sysimbrii Stephens, 1829
- Nedyus troglodytes Stephens, 1831
- Nedyus uniguttatus Stephens, 1831
- Nedyus vitiosus (Dietz, 1896)
