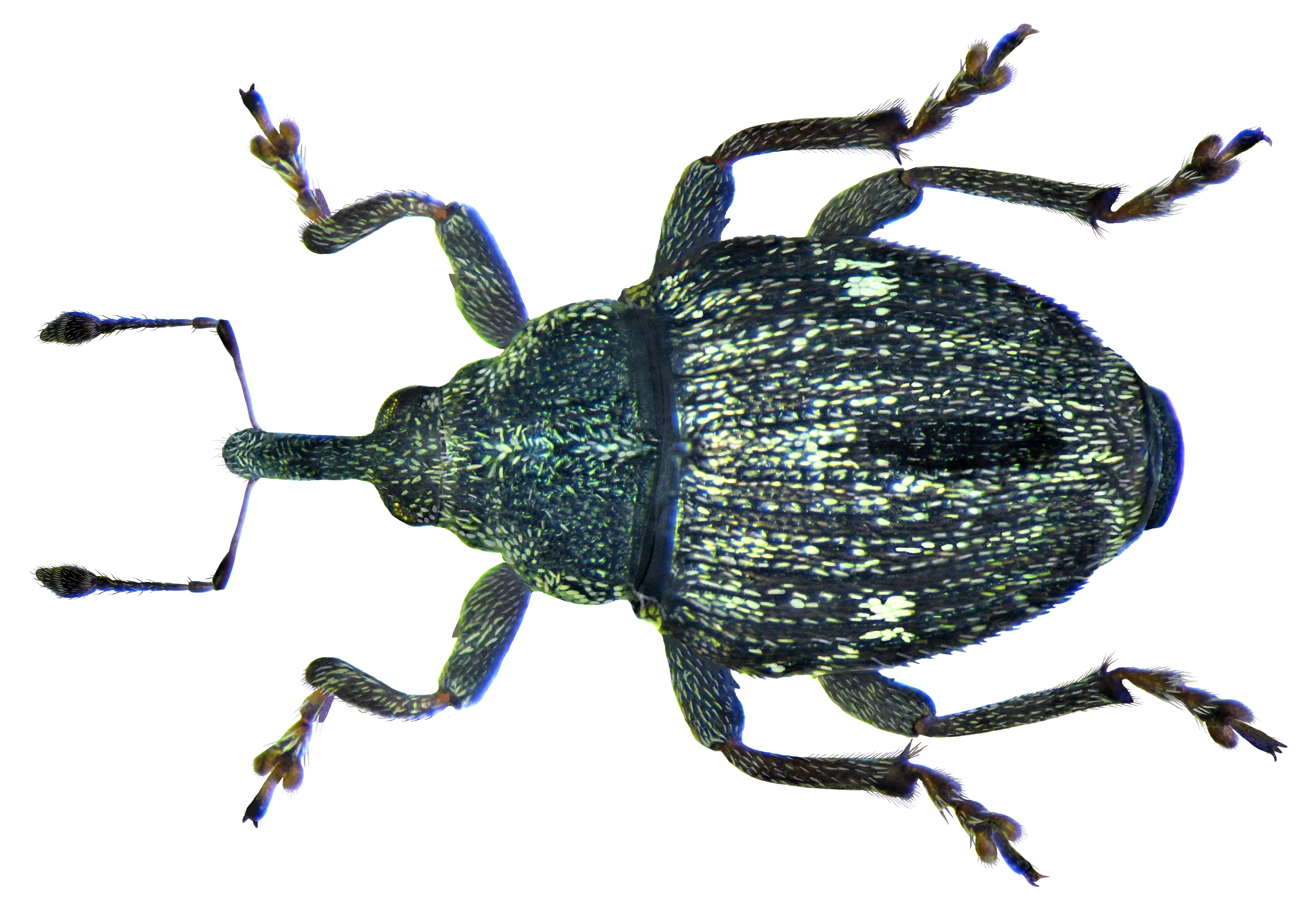
- Nedyus quadrimaculatus 2,9 mm (2,6-3,2 mm)

Scientific classification
- Kingdom: Animalia
- Phylum: Arthropoda
- Class: Insecta
- Order: Coleoptera
- Suborder: Polyphaga
- Infraorder: Cucujiformia
- Family: Curculionidae
- Genus: Nedyus
- Species: N. quadrimaculatus

Binomial name
- Nedyus quadrimaculatus (Linnaeus, 1758)

= Nedyus quadrimaculatus =

Species of beetle

Nedyus quadrimaculatus is a species of weevil native to Europe.
