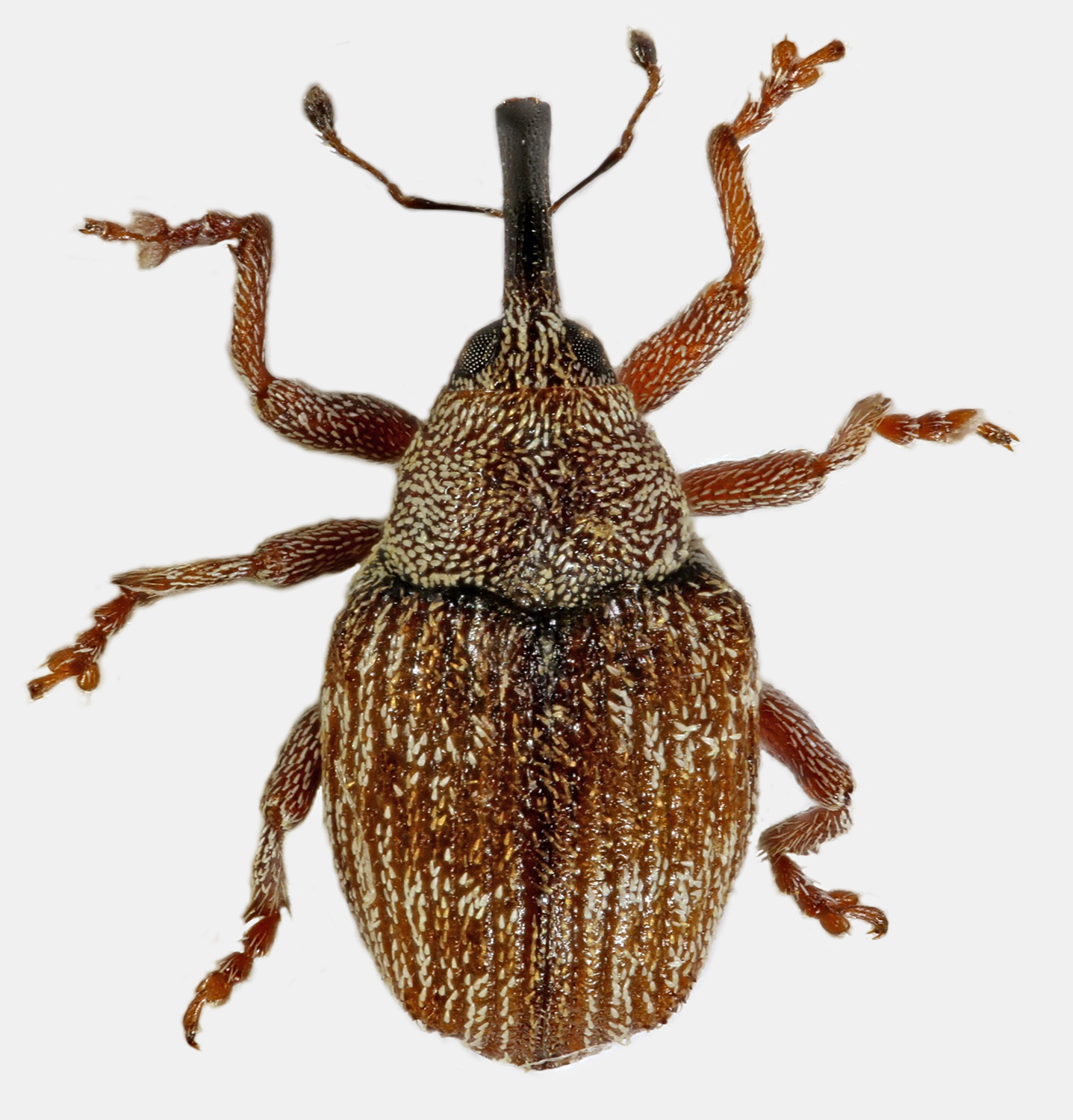
- Coeliodes rana

Scientific classification
- Kingdom: Animalia
- Phylum: Arthropoda
- Clade: Pancrustacea
- Class: Insecta
- Order: Coleoptera
- Suborder: Polyphaga
- Infraorder: Cucujiformia
- Superfamily: Curculionoidea
- Family: Curculionidae
- Subfamily: Ceutorhynchinae
- Tribe: Ceutorhynchini
- Genus: Coeliodes
- Species: C. rana

Binomial name
- Coeliodes rana ( Fabricius, 1787)

= Coeliodes rana =

Species of beetle

Coeliodes rana is a species of weevil native to Europe.
