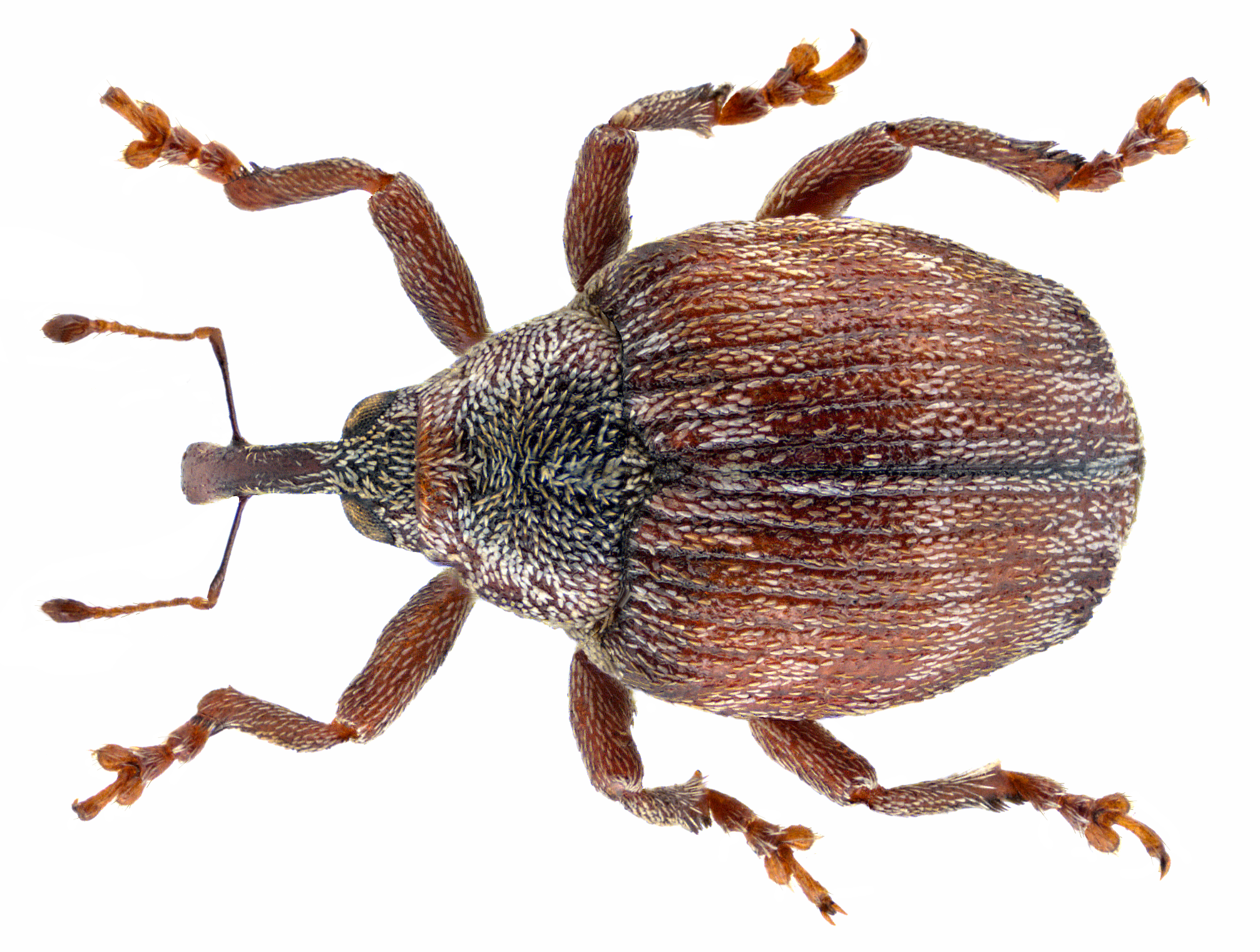
- Coeliodes ruber(2,8-3,5 mm)

Scientific classification
- Domain: Eukaryota
- Kingdom: Animalia
- Phylum: Arthropoda
- Class: Insecta
- Order: Coleoptera
- Suborder: Polyphaga
- Infraorder: Cucujiformia
- Family: Curculionidae
- Subfamily: Ceutorhynchinae
- Tribe: Ceutorhynchini
- Genus: Coeliodes
- Species: C. ruber

Binomial name
- Coeliodes ruber (Marsham, 1802)

= Coeliodes ruber =

Species of beetle

Coeliodes ruber is a species of weevil native to Europe.
