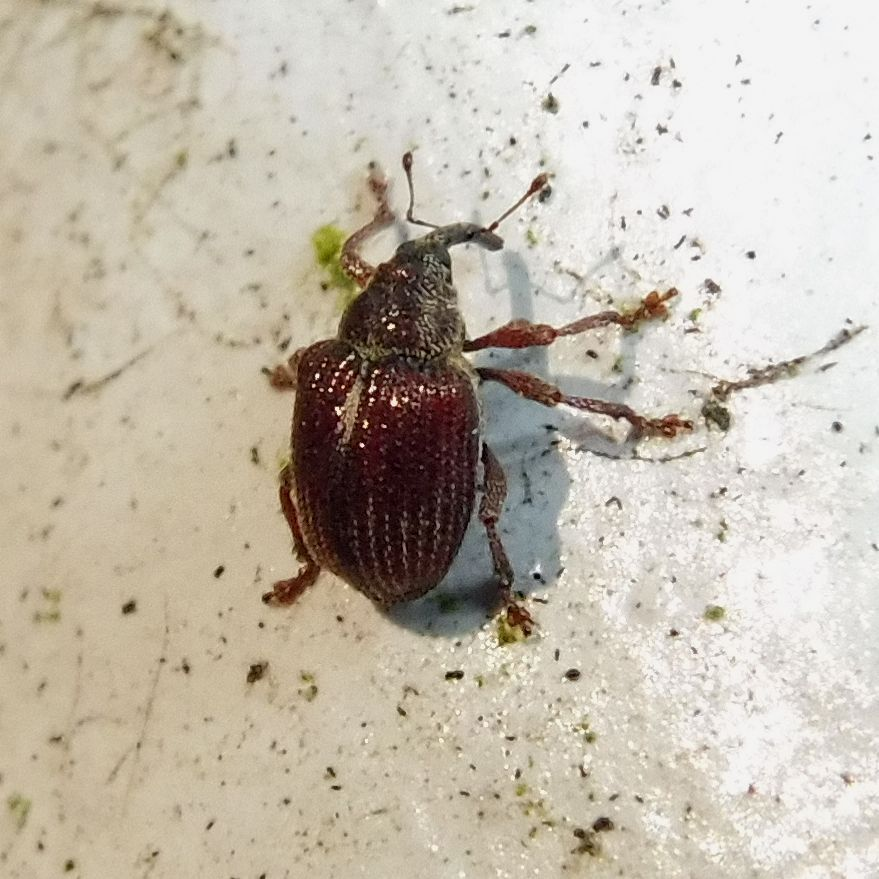
- Coeliodes rubicundus, UK

Scientific classification
- Kingdom: Animalia
- Phylum: Arthropoda
- Class: Insecta
- Order: Coleoptera
- Suborder: Polyphaga
- Infraorder: Cucujiformia
- Family: Curculionidae
- Subfamily: Ceutorhynchinae
- Tribe: Ceutorhynchini
- Genus: Coeliodes; Schönherr, 1837

Synonyms
- Brevicoeliodes Korotyaev, 1997; Caeliodes Westwood, 1838; Coelides Weise, 1883; Coeliotes Hochhuth, 1847; Coeloides Faust, 1885; Megacetes C.G.Thomson, 1859

= Coeliodes =

Genus of beetles

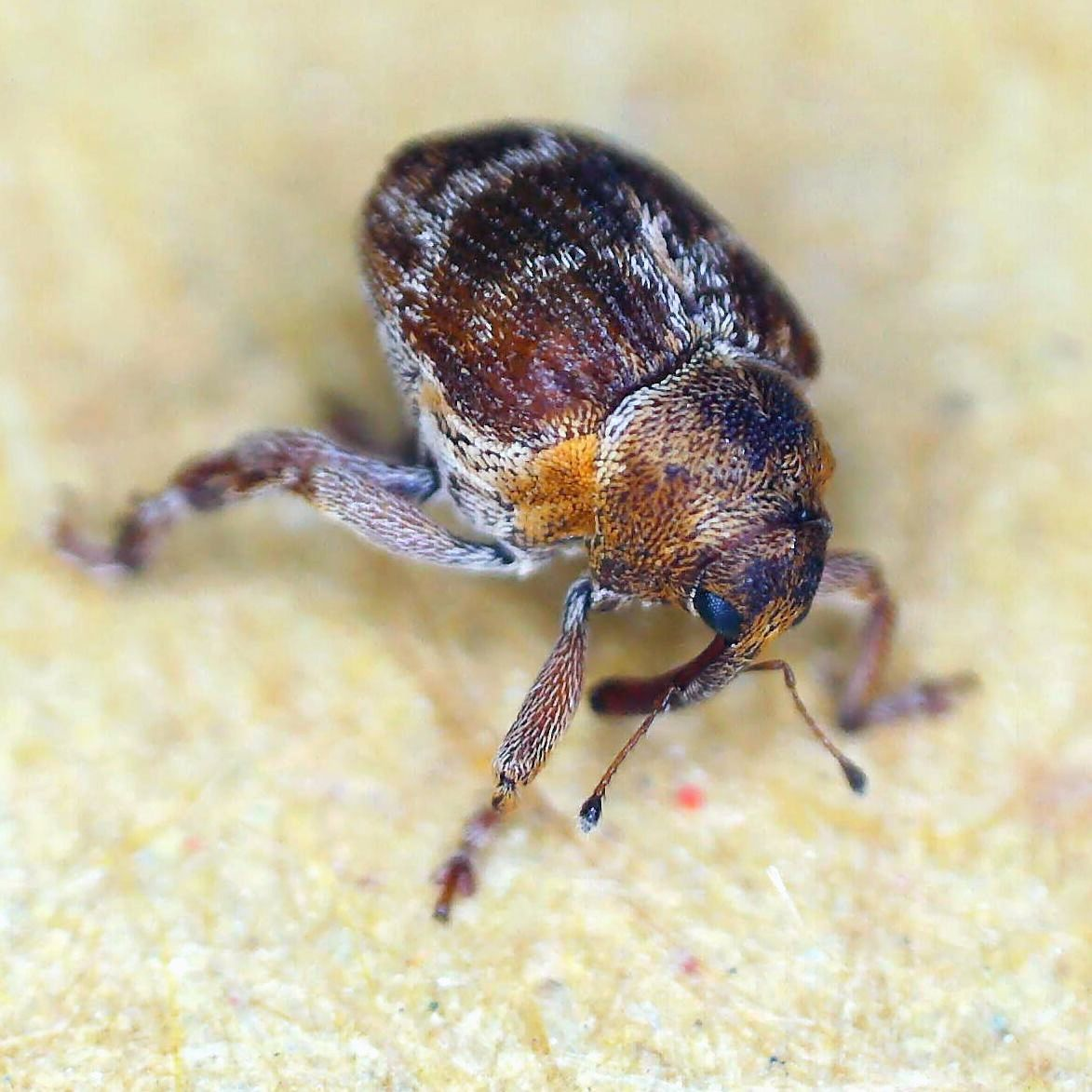
Coeliodes transversealbofasciatus, UK

Coeliodes is a genus of minute seed weevils in the beetle family Curculionidae. There are more than 140 described species in Coeliodes. They are found mainly in Europe, but also in Asia, Africa, and North America.

== Species ==
These 143 species belong to the genus Coeliodes:

- Coeliodes acephalus Say, 1824
- Coeliodes aeneus Hustache, 1924
- Coeliodes aequabilis Schultze, 1898
- Coeliodes aequalibis Schultze, 1902
- Coeliodes affinis Schoenh., 1837
- Coeliodes albovarius Bohem., 1859
- Coeliodes amamianus Yoshitake, 1999
- Coeliodes andalusicus Schultze, 1903
- Coeliodes angulipennis Solari, 1940
- Coeliodes apicalis Dietz., 1896
- Coeliodes asperatus J. Lec., 1876
- Coeliodes assimilis Yoshitake & Kojima, 2001
- Coeliodes babai Voss & Chûjô, 1960
- Coeliodes bicoloratus Desbr., 1895-96
- Coeliodes boviei Hustache, 1923
- Coeliodes brevirostris Schultze, 1898
- Coeliodes bruchi Hustache, 1926
- Coeliodes brunneus Hustache, 1916
- Coeliodes canaliculatus Gyllenhal, 1837
- Coeliodes castaneus Korotyaev, 1997
- Coeliodes caucasius Colonnelli, 1997
- Coeliodes celastri Rosensch. in Schoenh., 1837
- Coeliodes chobauti Hustache, 1946
- Coeliodes cinctus Chevr., 1861
- Coeliodes concolor Hoffmann, 1955
- Coeliodes congener Foerster, 1849
- Coeliodes cristatus Gyll. in Schoenh., 1837
- Coeliodes cruralis J. Lec., 1876
- Coeliodes curtus Schoenherr, 1837
- Coeliodes decorsei Hust., 1919
- Coeliodes dentatus Pic, 1923
- Coeliodes dentimanus Reitt., 1895
- Coeliodes dentipes Schultze, 1894
- Coeliodes desbrochersi Schultze, 1898
- Coeliodes devillei Hoffmann, 1955
- Coeliodes didymus Gyll. in Schoenh., 1837
- Coeliodes dohrni Schultze, 1901
- Coeliodes echinatus Gyll. in Schoenh., 1837
- Coeliodes edoughensis Desbr., 1895-96
- Coeliodes ellenbergeri Hustache, 1934
- Coeliodes epilobii Gyll. in Schoenh., 1837
- Coeliodes erythroleucos
- Coeliodes etorofuensis Kôno, 1935
- Coeliodes exiguus Gyll. in Schoenh., 1837
- Coeliodes fallax Boheman, 1844
- Coeliodes femoralis Yoshitake & Kojima, 2001
- Coeliodes firmicornis Schultze, 1897
- Coeliodes flavicaudis Bohem. in Schoenh., 1845
- Coeliodes formosanus Yoshitake & Kojima, 2001
- Coeliodes fuliginosus Schoenherr, 1837
- Coeliodes fulvus
- Coeliodes galloisi Hustache, 1916
- Coeliodes ganglionus Bohem. in Schoenh., 1845
- Coeliodes geranii Gyll. in Schoenh., 1837
- Coeliodes glabirostris Fåhr., 1871
- Coeliodes gokani Yoshitake, 2000
- Coeliodes granulicollis Schoenh., 1837
- Coeliodes gressitti Korotyaev, 1997
- Coeliodes guttula Gyll. in Schoenh., 1837
- Coeliodes haemorrhoidalis Schoenherr, 1837
- Coeliodes hoffmanni Weise, 1883
- Coeliodes ilicis Bedel, 1882-88
- Coeliodes imitator H. Wagn., 1928-29
- Coeliodes infuscatus Neresheimer, 1919
- Coeliodes insignis Yoshitake & Kojima, 2001
- Coeliodes insularis Korotyaev, 1997
- Coeliodes jelineki Colonnelli, 1997
- Coeliodes kasparyani Korotyaev, 1997
- Coeliodes kolenatii Kolen., 1859
- Coeliodes lamii Schoenherr, 1837
- Coeliodes leprosus Bohem. in Schoenh., 1845
- Coeliodes lesnei
- Coeliodes longirostris Yoshitake & Kojima, 2001
- Coeliodes major Yoshitake & Kojima, 2001
- Coeliodes mannerheimi Gyll. in Schoenh., 1837
- Coeliodes mannerheimii Gyllenhal, 1837
- Coeliodes maroccanus Hustache, 1946
- Coeliodes mathieui Hustache, 1926
- Coeliodes maynei Hust., 1926
- Coeliodes melanocephalus Stephens, 1831
- Coeliodes melanorhynchus Sahlberg,
- Coeliodes mesopotamicus Korotyaev, 1997
- Coeliodes mirabilis Villa, 1835
- Coeliodes murinus Schultze, 1901
- Coeliodes mysticus Kolen., 1859
- Coeliodes nakanoensis Hustache, 1916
- Coeliodes nebulosus J. Lec., 1876
- Coeliodes nigritarsis Hoffmann, 1963
- Coeliodes nigrotibialis Hoffmann, 1955
- Coeliodes pallidulus Schultze, 1896
- Coeliodes parcesquamosus Hustache, 1916
- Coeliodes pilosus Matsum., 1911
- Coeliodes plagiatus Desbr., 1895-96
- Coeliodes plurituberculatus Hustache, 1924
- Coeliodes proximus Schultze, 1895
- Coeliodes pudicus Rottenb., 1871
- Coeliodes pulvillus Schultze, 1899
- Coeliodes punctulum Schoenherr, 1837
- Coeliodes quercus
- Coeliodes quinquetuberculatus Rosensch. in Schoenh., 1837
- Coeliodes rana (Fabricius & J.C., 1787)
- Coeliodes riguus Boheman, 1844
- Coeliodes ruber (Marsham, T., 1802)
- Coeliodes rubicundulus Bohem. in Schoenh., 1845
- Coeliodes rubicundus (Paykull & G.de, 1800)
- Coeliodes rubricollis Schultze, 1901
- Coeliodes rubricus Gyll. in Schoenh., 1837
- Coeliodes ruficornis Schoenherr, 1837
- Coeliodes rufirostris Stephens, 1831
- Coeliodes schuppeli Boheman, 1844
- Coeliodes serietuberculatus Gyllenhal, 1837
- Coeliodes setifer Schultze, 1898
- Coeliodes setosus Fåhrs., 1871
- Coeliodes setulosus Hust., 1926
- Coeliodes sibiricus Reitt., 1916
- Coeliodes sicardi Hustache, 1931
- Coeliodes siculus Schultze, 1901
- Coeliodes simulans Faust, 1889
- Coeliodes sinensis Korotyaev, 1997
- Coeliodes solarii Baccetti, 1960
- Coeliodes splendidus Ch. Bris., 1889
- Coeliodes stigma Fåhrs., 1871
- Coeliodes stilleri Reitt., 1913
- Coeliodes strigatirostris Hochh.,
- Coeliodes strigirostris Schultze, 1901
- Coeliodes subfarinosus Schultze, 1898
- Coeliodes submontanus Voss, E., 1960
- Coeliodes subplagiatus Desbr., 1899
- Coeliodes subrubicundus Reitt., 1916
- Coeliodes subrufus Schoenherr, 1837
- Coeliodes subulirostris Gyllenhal, 1837
- Coeliodes taiwanensis Yoshitake & Kojima, 2001
- Coeliodes transversealbofasciatus (Goeze & J.A.E., 1777)
- Coeliodes trifasciatus Bach, 1854
- Coeliodes uedai Yoshitake & Kojima, 2001
- Coeliodes umbraculatus Schoenherr, 1837
- Coeliodes umbrinus Gyllenhal, 1837
- Coeliodes vitiosus Dietz, 1895
- Coeliodes wewalkai Dieckmann, 1979
- Coeliodes zinovjevi Korotyaev, 1997
- Coeliodes zonatus Germ., 1845
- † Coeliodes primigenius Oustalet, E., 1874
- † Coeliodes primotinus Scudder, 1893
