= Pseudapoderus =

Scientific classification
- Kingdom: Animalia
- Phylum: Arthropoda
- Clade: Pancrustacea
- Class: Insecta
- Order: Coleoptera
- Suborder: Polyphaga
- Infraorder: Cucujiformia
- Superfamily: Curculionoidea
- Family: Attelabidae
- Subfamily: Apoderinae
- Tribe: Hoplapoderini
- Genus: Pseudapoderus; Voss, E., 1926

Synonyms
- Flavopoderus Legalov, 2007

Genus of weevils

Pseudapoderus is a genus of leaf-rolling weevils (family Attelabidae) in the subfamily Apoderinae. They are native to western, central, and southern Africa.

== Distribution ==
The species of Pseudapoderus are native across western, central, and southern Africa, specifically The Gambia, Guinea-Bissau, Guinea, Sierra Leone, Togo, Niger, Nigeria, Cameroon, Gabon, Republic of the Congo, Democratic Republic of the Congo, Zimbabwe, South Africa, and a population in Ethiopia.

== Species ==
The following species are assigned to Pseudapoderus:

- Pseudapoderus aethiopicus Legalov, 2003 - Ethiopia
- Pseudapoderus bifasciatus Legalov, 2003 - Cameroon, Guinea, Nigeria, South Africa, Togo, DRC
- Pseudapoderus flavus Legalov, 2007 - Congo
- Pseudapoderus gambiensis Legalov, 2007 - The Gambia
- Pseudapoderus ghesquierei Legalov, 2003 -
- Pseudapoderus languidus Legalov, 2007 - Guinea, Nigeria, DRC, Sierra Leone
- Pseudapoderus melanopus Legalov, 2007 - Zimbabwe
- Pseudapoderus nigroflavus Legalov, 2007 - Guinea
- Pseudapoderus persimilis Legalov, 2007 - DRC
- Pseudapoderus suroensis Legalov, 2007 - Guinea-Bissau
- Pseudapoderus tenuicolus Legalov, 2003 - Cameroon, Niger
- Pseudapoderus testaceus Legalov, 2003
- Pseudapoderus unguicularis Legalov, 2007 - DRC
