= Parapoderus =

- Parapoderus nigripennis

Scientific classification
- Kingdom: Animalia
- Phylum: Arthropoda
- Clade: Pancrustacea
- Class: Insecta
- Order: Coleoptera
- Suborder: Polyphaga
- Infraorder: Cucujiformia
- Superfamily: Curculionoidea
- Family: Attelabidae
- Subfamily: Apoderinae
- Tribe: Hoplapoderini
- Genus: Parapoderus; Voss, E., 1926

Genus of weevils

Parapoderus is a genus of leaf-rolling weevils (Attelabidae), in the subfamily Apoderinae. The species in this genus are native across Africa.

== Distribution ==
The species are distributed across southern and southeastern, central, and west Africa.

== Species ==
The following species are assigned to Parapoderus:

- Parapoderus ambiguus Voss, 1933
- Parapoderus angustifrons Voss, 1926
- Parapoderus anxius Voss, 1926
- Parapoderus arboretum Voss, 1926
- Parapoderus atrotibiatus Voss, 1926
- Parapoderus balteatus Dalla Torre & Voss, 1930
- Parapoderus balteus Voss, 1926
- Parapoderus benitoensis Voss, 1928
- Parapoderus bifasciatus Voss, 1926
- Parapoderus biplagiata Voss, 1928
- Parapoderus brachypterus Voss, 1926
- Parapoderus burgeoni Voss, 1926
- Parapoderus calceata Voss, 1937
- Parapoderus calceatoides Voss, 1928
- Parapoderus calceatus Faust, 1883
- Parapoderus callosicollis Dalla Torre & Voss, 1930
- Parapoderus cardinalis Voss, 1926
- Parapoderus carneola Voss, 1937
- Parapoderus carneolus Dalla Torre & Voss, 1930
- Parapoderus centralis Dalla Torre & Voss, 1930
- Parapoderus cephalotes Voss, 1926
- Parapoderus cinctipennis Voss, 1926
- Parapoderus clivicollis Voss, 1953
- Parapoderus congener Voss, 1928
- Parapoderus congoanus Voss, 1937
- Parapoderus conradti Voss, 1926
- Parapoderus consimilis Voss, 1928
- Parapoderus coralinus Voss, 1926
- Parapoderus corallinus Voss, 1926
- Parapoderus cribropunctatus Voss, 1926
- Parapoderus crispipennis Voss, 1926
- Parapoderus cyaneus Voss, 1929
- Parapoderus deceptor Voss, 1926
- Parapoderus denticulatus Voss, 1926
- Parapoderus despectus Voss, 1956
- Parapoderus diffinis Voss, 1933
- Parapoderus dilucidifrons Voss, 1937
- Parapoderus dimidiatipennis Voss, 1937
- Parapoderus distinguendulus Voss, 1926
- Parapoderus dorsalis Pering, 1892
- Parapoderus dualaicus Voss, 1926
- Parapoderus ealaana Voss, 1939
- Parapoderus fabricii Voss, 1926
- Parapoderus flavobasis Voss, 1926
- Parapoderus flavoebenus J. Thoms., 1858
- Parapoderus flavoniger Voss, 1928
- Parapoderus flavonotatus Voss, 1926
- Parapoderus flavotinctus Voss, 1926
- Parapoderus foveipennis Voss, 1926
- Parapoderus foveolatus Voss, 1926
- Parapoderus fuscicornis (Fabricius, J.C., 1792)
- Parapoderus ghesquierei Voss, 1939
- Parapoderus glabricala Voss, 1926
- Parapoderus glabriculus Voss, 1926
- Parapoderus guineensis Voss, 1926
- Parapoderus haemopterus Voss, 1926
- Parapoderus haemorrhoidalis (Olivier, A.G., 1807)
- Parapoderus hemixanthocnemis Voss, 1926
- Parapoderus iluriensis Voss, 1944
- Parapoderus imparis Voss, 1939
- Parapoderus impressiverticalis Voss, 1926
- Parapoderus isabellinus Voss, 1926
- Parapoderus ituriensis Voss, 1944
- Parapoderus kamerunensis Voss, 1926
- Parapoderus kivuensis Hustache, 1937
- Parapoderus languidus Voss, 1926
- Parapoderus lepersonneae Voss, 1944
- Parapoderus luctuosa Voss, 1926
- Parapoderus luluanus Voss, 1937
- Parapoderus maculifrons Voss, 1926
- Parapoderus melanocnemis Voss, 1926
- Parapoderus miniatus Pering, 1888
- Parapoderus minutissimus Voss, 1926
- Parapoderus mixtus Dalla Torre & Voss, 1930
- Parapoderus nigerrima Voss, 1937
- Parapoderus nigricornis Voss, 1926
- Parapoderus nigrigeniculata Voss, 1933
- Parapoderus nigripedestris Voss, 1933
- Parapoderus nigripennis (Fabricius, J.C., 1792)
- Parapoderus nigripes Voss, 1926
- Parapoderus nigritarsis Voss, 1926
- Parapoderus nigrohumeralis Voss, 1926
- Parapoderus nigrohumerata Voss, 1926
- Parapoderus nigromarginatus Voss, 1926
- Parapoderus nigroscutellaris Voss, 1926
- Parapoderus nigroscutellatus Voss, 1926
- Parapoderus nigrotibialis Voss, 1926
- Parapoderus nilgiriensis Voss, 1936
- Parapoderus nyashekeanus Hustache, 1939
- Parapoderus obscuriceps Voss, 1933
- Parapoderus obscuripennis Voss, 1926
- Parapoderus obscuripes Voss, 1926
- Parapoderus ochrobasis Voss, 1926
- Parapoderus panganicus Voss, 1926
- Parapoderus partita Faust, 1894
- Parapoderus partitoida Voss, 1944
- Parapoderus patricius Voss, 1928
- Parapoderus pectoralis (Thunberg, C.P., 1813)
- Parapoderus perfecta Voss, 1926
- Parapoderus perfectoida Voss, 1939
- Parapoderus peringueyi Faust, 1893
- Parapoderus perrieri Voss, 1955
- Parapoderus picturata Voss, 1926
- Parapoderus picturatoida Voss, 1937
- Parapoderus picturatoides Voss, 1933
- Parapoderus propinquus Faust, 1926
- Parapoderus psuedotolerans Voss, 1926
- Parapoderus pseudovitreus Voss, 1926
- Parapoderus rhombopoensis Voss, 1937
- Parapoderus robustidorsis Voss, 1926
- Parapoderus rubens Voss, 1926
- Parapoderus ruberripes Voss, 1926
- Parapoderus rubripes Voss, 1926
- Parapoderus rubritarsis Voss, 1939
- Parapoderus rubrofasciata Voss, 1926
- Parapoderus rubromarginata Voss, 1926
- Parapoderus rubromarginatus Voss, 1926
- Parapoderus rufinasus Faust, 1899
- Parapoderus rufoapicalis Voss, 1926
- Parapoderus rutshuruanus Hustache, 1939
- Parapoderus sanguineus (Olivier, A.G., 1807)
- Parapoderus selenostoma Voss, 1926
- Parapoderus selonostoma Voss, 1926
- Parapoderus seminiger Voss, 1926
- Parapoderus semipallens Voss, 1926
- Parapoderus simplex Voss, 1933
- Parapoderus sjoestedti Voss, 1926
- Parapoderus staudingeri Voss, 1926
- Parapoderus striatipennis Dalla Torre & Voss, 1930
- Parapoderus subimparis Voss, 1937
- Parapoderus submarginatus Voss, 1926
- Parapoderus subniger Voss, 1926
- Parapoderus sylvatica Voss, 1926
- Parapoderus sylvaticus Voss, 1926
- Parapoderus tamsi Voss, 1937
- Parapoderus testaceicollis Voss, 1933
- Parapoderus testaceicornis Voss, 1939
- Parapoderus testaceipennis Voss, 1926
- Parapoderus testaceus Voss, 1926
- Parapoderus thomsoni Faust, 1894
- Parapoderus thoracomelas Voss, 1926
- Parapoderus tibialis Hustache, 1923
- Parapoderus tolerans Voss, 1926
- Parapoderus transvaalensis Voss, 1928
- Parapoderus tricolor Voss, 1933
- Parapoderus trigonocephalus Voss, 1926
- Parapoderus ueleensis Voss, 1937
- Parapoderus usambicus Voss, 1926
- Parapoderus varicolor Dalla Torre & Voss, 1930
- Parapoderus vitreus Voss, 1926
- Parapoderus vittatus Voss, 1935
- Parapoderus vulcanicus Hustache, 1939

== Gallery ==
P. balteus

P. fuscicornis

P. fuscicornis in flight

P. nigripennis in South Africa

P. nigrotibialis

P. submarginatus
