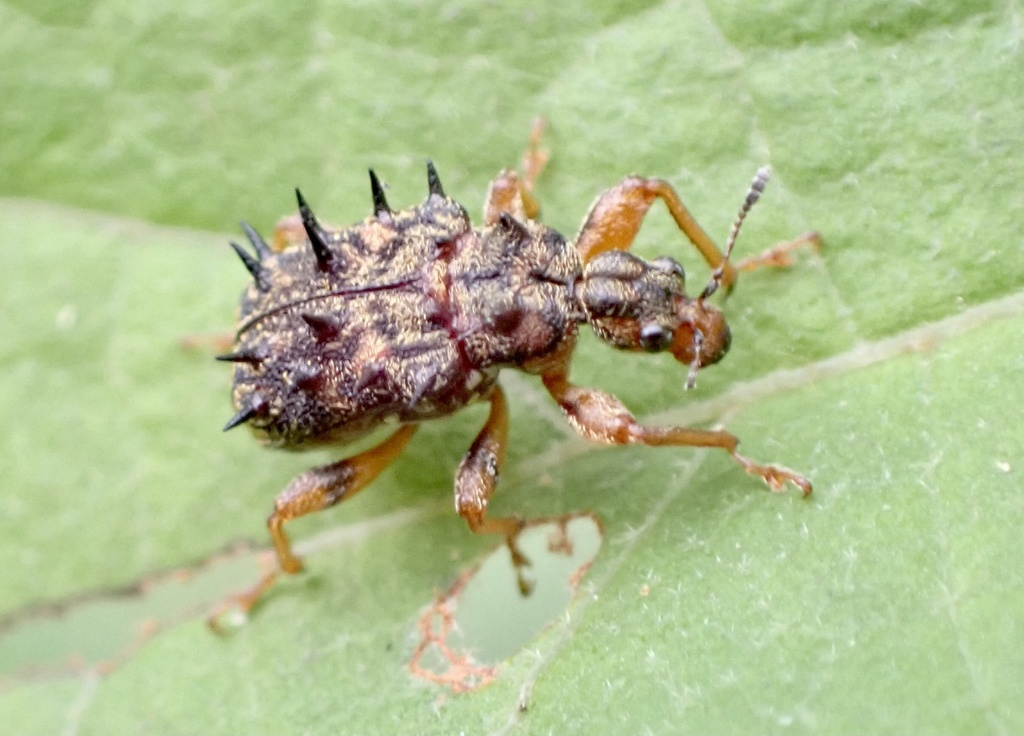
- Rhamnapoderus auricapillus in Ghana

Scientific classification
- Kingdom: Animalia
- Phylum: Arthropoda
- Clade: Pancrustacea
- Class: Insecta
- Order: Coleoptera
- Suborder: Polyphaga
- Infraorder: Cucujiformia
- Superfamily: Curculionoidea
- Family: Attelabidae
- Subfamily: Apoderinae
- Tribe: Hoplapoderini
- Genus: Rhamnapoderus; Voss, E., 1926

Synonyms
- Janczykirhamnus Legalov, 2007; Jekelirhamnus Legalov, 2007; Kuntzenirhamnus Legalov, 2007; Rhamnapoderites Legalov, 2007; Rhamnapoderoides Legalov, 2007

= Rhamnapoderus =

Genus of weevils

Rhamnapoderus is a genus of leaf-rolling weevils in the subfamily Apoderinae.

== Distribution ==
The species in Rhamnapoderus are found in Africa. They have been found in Angola, Botswana, Gabon, Kenya, Mozambique, South Africa, Tanzania, and Uganda.

== Species ==
The following species are assigned to this genus:

- Rhamnapoderus ahansis Legalov, 2007
- Rhamnapoderus atrox Faust, 1899
- Rhamnapoderus auricapillus Voss, 1926
- Rhamnapoderus blydrivierensis Legalov, 2007
- Rhamnapoderus cephalotes Voss, 1926
- Rhamnapoderus cerberus Voss, 1926
- Rhamnapoderus diabolus Voss, 1926
- Rhamnapoderus dumosus Legalov, 2007
- Rhamnapoderus erythrocycla Voss, 1926
- Rhamnapoderus erythrocyclus Voss, 1926
- Rhamnapoderus karaseki Janczyk, 1960
- Rhamnapoderus nairobicus Janczyk, 1960
- Rhamnapoderus nigricornis Voss, 1933
- Rhamnapoderus palmi Legalov, 2007
- Rhamnapoderus pluto Kuntzen, 1915
- Rhamnapoderus porri Legalov, 2007
- Rhamnapoderus pseudodumosus Legalov, 2003
- Rhamnapoderus rothkirchi Voss, 1926
- Rhamnapoderus rucanansis Legalov, 2007
- Rhamnapoderus septemdumatus Legalov, 2007
- Rhamnapoderus spiculosus Legalov, 2007
- Rhamnapoderus spinidoris Legalov, 2007
- Rhamnapoderus spinifer Legalov, 2007
- Rhamnapoderus spinosus (Fabricius, 1792)
- Rhamnapoderus tawetensis Janczyk, 1960
- Rhamnapoderus tessmanni Legalov, 2007
- Rhamnapoderus verticalis Voss, 1926
- Rhamnapoderus xanthocycla Kuntzen, 1916
- Rhamnapoderus xanthocyclus Voss, 1926
