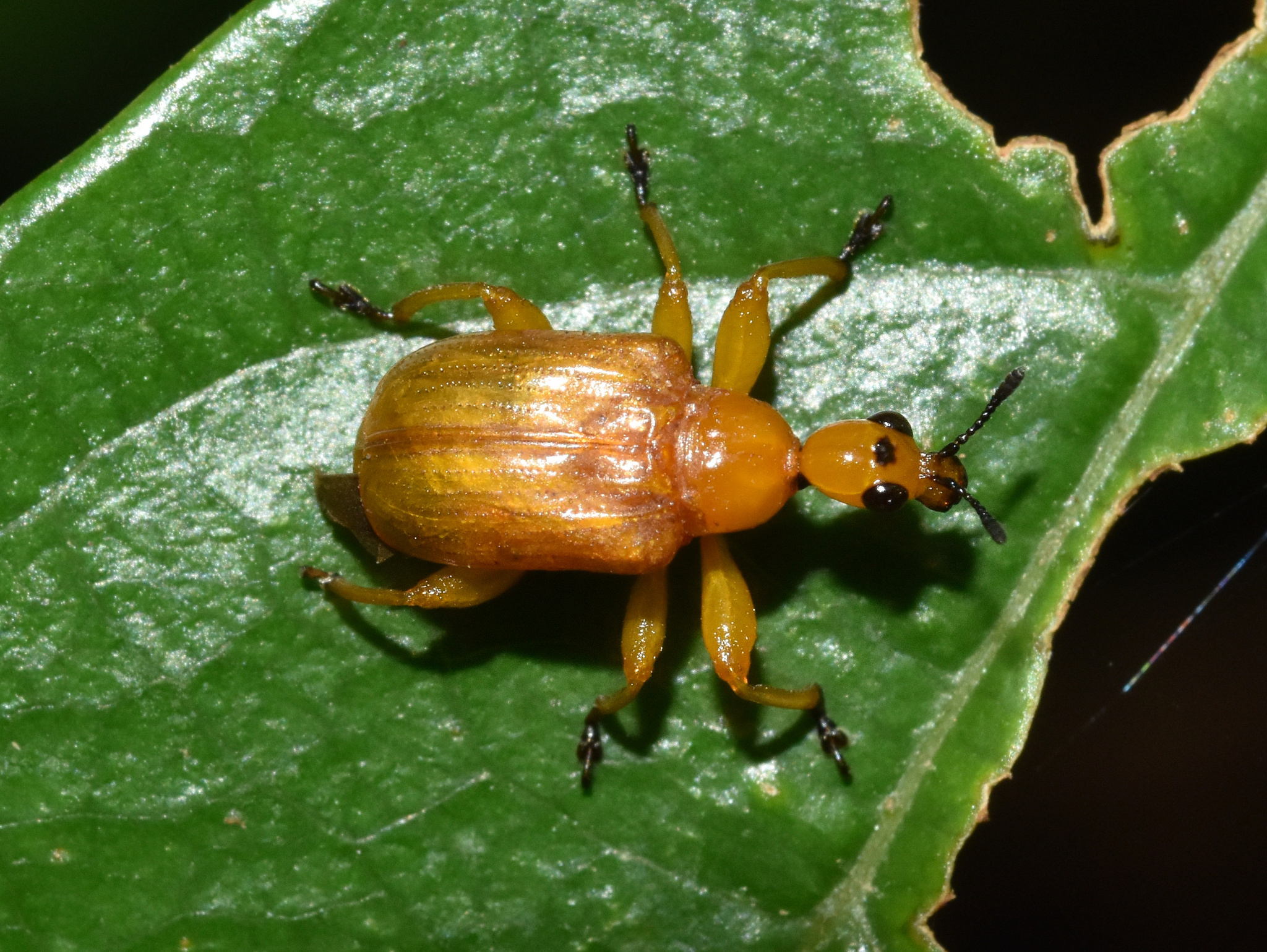
- Paratomapoderus maculifrons

Scientific classification
- Kingdom: Animalia
- Phylum: Arthropoda
- Clade: Pancrustacea
- Class: Insecta
- Order: Coleoptera
- Suborder: Polyphaga
- Infraorder: Cucujiformia
- Superfamily: Curculionoidea
- Family: Attelabidae
- Subfamily: Apoderinae
- Tribe: Hoplapoderini
- Genus: Paratomapoderus; Voss, 1926

Type species
- Paratomapoderus brachypterus Voss, 1926

Synonyms
- Convexoderus Legalov, 2003; Eoparapoderus Legalov, 2007; Parapoderopsis Legalov, 2007; Pirapoderus Legalov, 2007; Tanzanapoderus Legalov, 2007

= Paratomapoderus =

Genus of beetles

Paratomapoderus is a genus in the family Attelabidae, the leaf rolling weevils. Species in this genus are native to Africa.

== Species ==
The species recognized in Paratomapoderus are:

- Paratomapoderus ambiguus Legalov, 2007
- Paratomapoderus atrotibiatus Legalov, 2007
- Paratomapoderus balteus Legalov, 2007
- Paratomapoderus bananicus Legalov, 2007
- Paratomapoderus beninensis Legalov, 2007
- Paratomapoderus biplagiata Voss, 1928
- Paratomapoderus brachypterus Voss, 1926
- Paratomapoderus calceatus Legalov, 2007
- Paratomapoderus capitus Legalov, 2007
- Paratomapoderus consimilis Legalov, 2007
- Paratomapoderus cordieri Voss, 1928
- Paratomapoderus ealaanus Legalov, 2007
- Paratomapoderus flavoebenoides Legalov, 2007
- Paratomapoderus flavoebenus Legalov, 2007
- Paratomapoderus flavoniger Voss, 1928
- Paratomapoderus glabriculus Legalov, 2007
- Paratomapoderus guineensis Legalov, 2007
- Paratomapoderus haemorrhoidalis Legalov, 2007
- Paratomapoderus impressiverticalis Legalov, 2007
- Paratomapoderus kamerunensis Voss, 1926
- Paratomapoderus kivuensis Legalov, 2007
- Paratomapoderus libengensis Legalov, 2007
- Paratomapoderus luctuosus Legalov, 2007
- Paratomapoderus maculifrons Legalov, 2007
- Paratomapoderus madinensis Legalov, 2007
- Paratomapoderus melinus Voss, 1926
- Paratomapoderus miniatus Voss, 1926
- Paratomapoderus nigricornis Legalov, 2007
- Paratomapoderus nigripes Legalov, 2007
- Paratomapoderus nigrohumeratus Legalov, 2007
- Paratomapoderus nigroruber Voss, 1937
- Paratomapoderus nigrotibialis Legalov, 2007
- Paratomapoderus nigrovittatus Legalov, 2007
- Paratomapoderus obscuripennis Legalov, 2007
- Paratomapoderus obscuripes Legalov, 2007
- Paratomapoderus panganicus Legalov, 2007
- Paratomapoderus patricius Voss, 1928
- Paratomapoderus propinguus Legalov, 2007
- Paratomapoderus rhobompoensis Legalov, 2007
- Paratomapoderus rufonigrus Legalov, 2007
- Paratomapoderus sjoestedti Legalov, 2007
- Paratomapoderus thomsoni Legalov, 2007
- Paratomapoderus togoensis Voss, 1926
- Paratomapoderus transvaalensis Legalov, 2007
- Paratomapoderus usambicus Legalov, 2007
- Paratomapoderus varicolor Legalov, 2007

Formerly in this genus:

Paratomapoderus congoanus is now classified as Parapoderus congoanus.

== Gallery ==
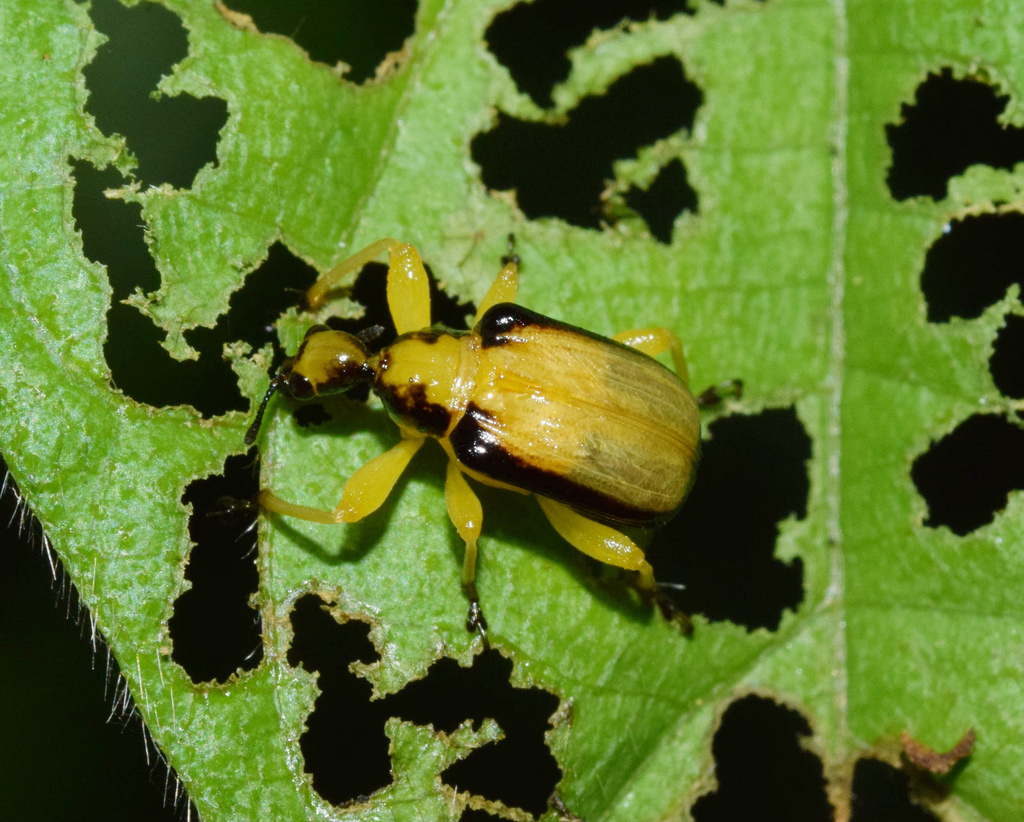
Paratomapoderus balteus near Westville, South Africa
