= Isapoderus =

Scientific classification
- Kingdom: Animalia
- Phylum: Arthropoda
- Clade: Pancrustacea
- Class: Insecta
- Order: Coleoptera
- Suborder: Polyphaga
- Infraorder: Cucujiformia
- Superfamily: Curculionoidea
- Family: Attelabidae
- Subfamily: Apoderinae
- Tribe: Hoplapoderini
- Genus: Isapoderus; Voss, E., 1937
- Species: I. cardinalis

Binomial name
- Isapoderus cardinalis Legalov, 2003

Genus of weevils

Isapoderus is a monotypic genus in the subfamily Apoderinae, in the family Attelabidae, the leaf-roller weevils, containing a single species, Isapoderus cardinalis.
