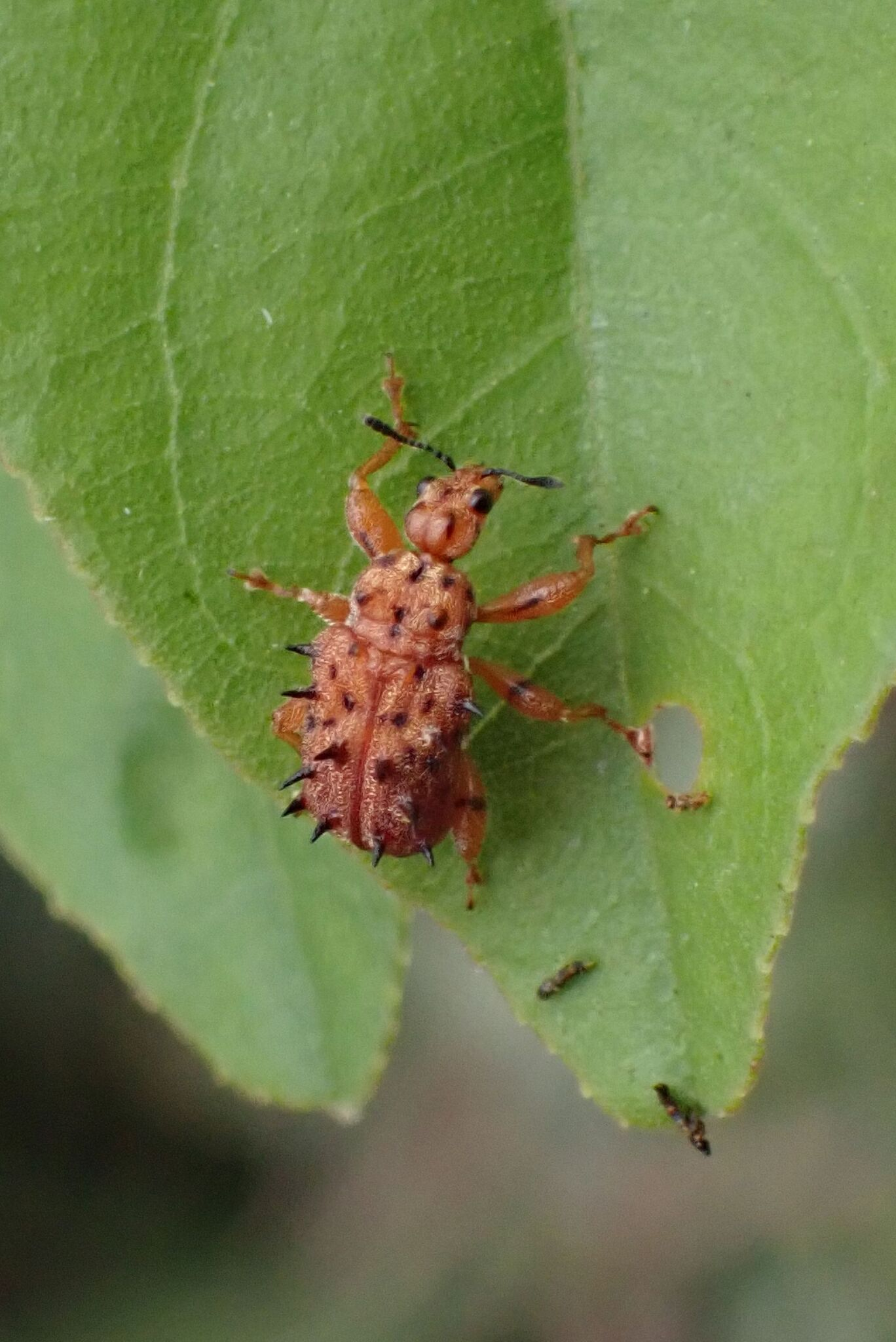
- Rhamnapoderus verticalis

Scientific classification
- Kingdom: Animalia
- Phylum: Arthropoda
- Clade: Pancrustacea
- Class: Insecta
- Order: Coleoptera
- Suborder: Polyphaga
- Infraorder: Cucujiformia
- Superfamily: Curculionoidea
- Family: Attelabidae
- Subfamily: Apoderinae
- Tribe: Hoplapoderini

Subtribes
- Afropoderina Legalov, 2003; Hoplapoderina Voss, 1926; Paratomapoderina Legalov, 2003

= Hoplapoderini =

Tribe of beetles

Hoplapoderini is a tribe of weevils of the subfamily Apoderinae. They are characterized by a strongly constricted head with a distinctively arched crown. The head shape is common to both males and females. They are distributed from Japan to the Indomalayan archipelago, as well as throughout Madagascar and Africa. Their lower body tends to be characterized by spots, pustules, bumps, or spines. Spines are particularly ubiquitous in those species found in Madagascar.

== Genera ==
The genera of Hoplapoderini are:

- Agomadaranus Voss, 1958
- Echinapoderus Voss, 1926
- Homapoderus Legalov, 2003
- Hoplapoderus Jekel, 1860
- Isapoderus Voss, 1937
- Madapoderus Biondi, 2005
- Parapoderus Voss, 1926
- Paratomapoderus Voss, 1926
- Paroplapoderus Voss, 1926
- Phymatapoderus Voss, 1926
- Pseudapoderus Voss, 1926
- Rhamnapoderus Voss, 1926
- Strigapoderopsis Legalov, 2003
- Tomapoderus Voss, 1926
- †Archiparapoderus Legalov, 2003
