= Echinapoderus =

- Echinapoderus horridulus near Amedzofe, Ghana

Scientific classification
- Kingdom: Animalia
- Phylum: Arthropoda
- Clade: Pancrustacea
- Class: Insecta
- Order: Coleoptera
- Suborder: Polyphaga
- Infraorder: Cucujiformia
- Superfamily: Curculionoidea
- Family: Attelabidae
- Subfamily: Apoderinae
- Tribe: Hoplapoderini
- Genus: Echinapoderus; Voss, 1926

Genus of weevils

Echinapoderus is a genus of weevils in the subfamily Apoderinae. The species in this genus are native to Southeast Africa, with small populations in West Africa and Southern Africa.

== Distribution ==
Species are native to Africa, specifically Southeastern Africa with a small population in Western Africa and Southern Africa, with them being found in Ghana, Uganda, Kenya, Tanzania, Malawi, Zambia, South Africa, and Madagascar.

== Species ==
The species assigned to this genus are:

- Echinapoderus aculeatus Voss, 1926
- Echinapoderus decolor Voss, 1926
- Echinapoderus ebeninus Kuntzen, 1915
- Echinapoderus enoplus Voss, 1926
- Echinapoderus graueri Janczyk, 1960
- Echinapoderus horridulus Voss, 1926
- Echinapoderus horridus Voss, 1926
- Echinapoderus kilimanus Auriv. in Sjostedt, 1910
- Echinapoderus madegassus Janczyk, 1960
- Echinapoderus partialis Voss, 1929
- Echinapoderus partitialis Voss, 1929
- Echinapoderus schroederi Voss, 1926
- Echinapoderus sikorai Janczyk, 1960
- Echinapoderus tristicula Voss, 1933
- Echinapoderus ugandaensis Voss, 1933
- Echinapoderus ugandensis Voss, 1926
- Echinapoderus ukaikaicus Janczyk, 1960
