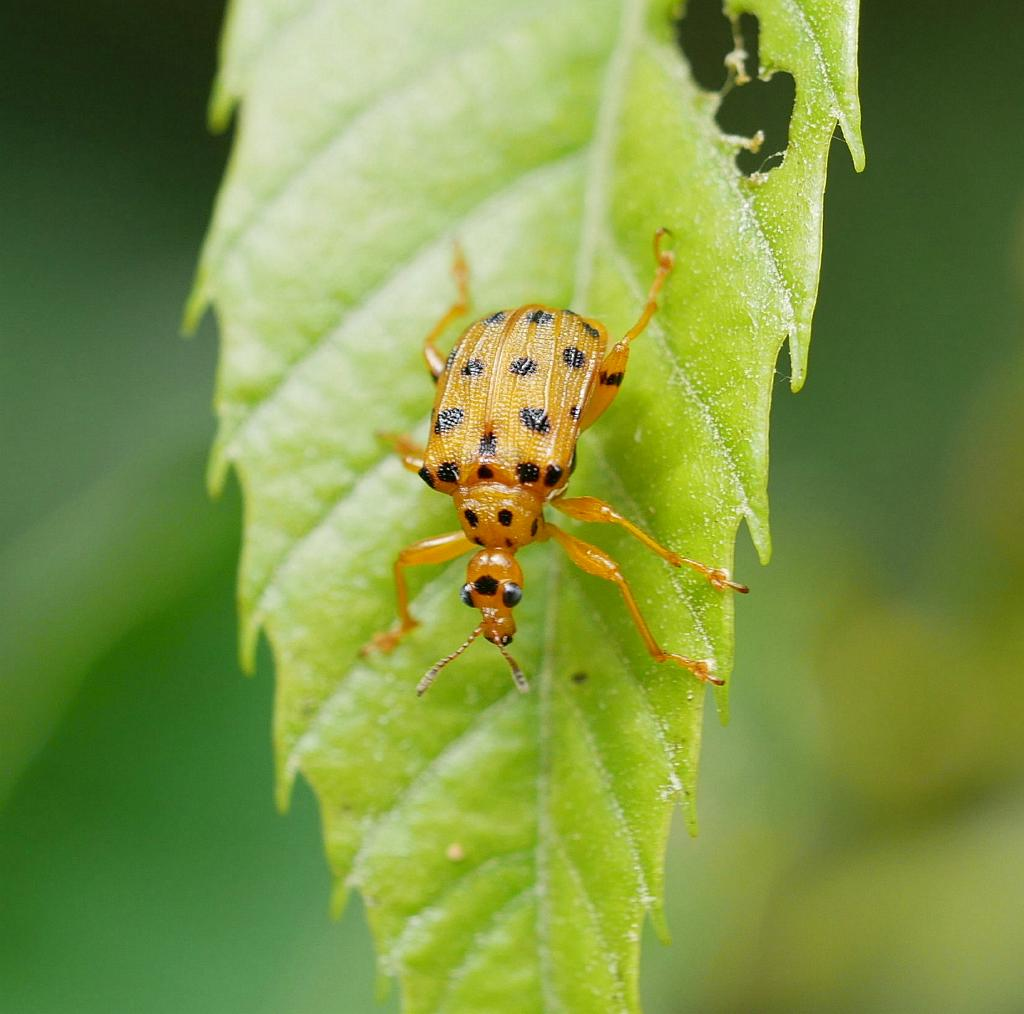
- Paroplapoderus pardalis

Scientific classification
- Kingdom: Animalia
- Phylum: Arthropoda
- Clade: Pancrustacea
- Class: Insecta
- Order: Coleoptera
- Suborder: Polyphaga
- Infraorder: Cucujiformia
- Superfamily: Curculionoidea
- Family: Attelabidae
- Subfamily: Apoderinae
- Tribe: Hoplapoderini
- Genus: Paroplapoderus; Voss, E., 1926

Synonyms
- Erycapoderus Voss, 1926; Gomadaranus Kôno, 1930; Parahoplapoderus Voss, 1926; Paraplapoderus Pic, 1928; Pargomadaranus Legalov, 2004; Pseudplapoderus Legalov, 2003

= Paroplapoderus =

Genus of weevils

P. angulipennis, South Korea

P. tristoides, Taiwan

P. vanvolxemi, Japan

Paroplapoderus is a genus of leaf-rolling weevils (family Attelabidae) in the subfamily Apoderinae that are native across eastern and southeastern Asia.

== Distribution ==
The species of Paroplapoderus are distributed across east Asia, with small populations in southeast Asia and India. The places they are most dominant are, in order of least to most dominance: Japan, Taiwan, and South Korea.

== Species ==
The following species are assigned to Paroplapoderus:

- Paroplapoderus abdominalis Kôno, 1930
- Paroplapoderus amoenus Voss, 1926
- Paroplapoderus angulipennis Voss, 1926
- Paroplapoderus annapurnae Legalov, 2007
- Paroplapoderus armatus Voss, 1926
- Paroplapoderus basalis Voss, 1926
- Paroplapoderus biangulatus Voss, 1928
- Paroplapoderus bihumeratus Voss, 1929
- Paroplapoderus bistrispinosus Faust, 1894
- Paroplapoderus bituberculatus Voss, 1926
- Paroplapoderus breviceps Voss, 1926
- Paroplapoderus coniceps Voss, 1926
- Paroplapoderus doriae Legalov, 2003
- Paroplapoderus fallax Voss, 1926
- Paroplapoderus fasciatus Voss, 1928
- Paroplapoderus funerula Voss, 1926
- Paroplapoderus hauseri Voss, 1930
- Paroplapoderus hustachei Pic, 1923
- Paroplapoderus japonicus Voss, 1926
- Paroplapoderus kryzhanovskyi Legalov, 2003
- Paroplapoderus kuanchenensis Legalov, 2007
- Paroplapoderus lefroyi Mshl., 1913
- Paroplapoderus maculata Voss, 1926
- Paroplapoderus maculiceps Voss, 1926
- Paroplapoderus malaccana Voss, 1926
- Paroplapoderus malaisei Marshall, 1948
- Paroplapoderus melanostictoides Legalov, 2003
- Paroplapoderus melanostictus Voss, 1926
- Paroplapoderus multicostatus Pic, 1928
- Paroplapoderus nakamurai Kôno, 1930
- Paroplapoderus nigriceps Legalov, 2007
- Paroplapoderus nigrimanus Kôno, 1930
- Paroplapoderus nigroguttatus Kôno, 1930
- Paroplapoderus obtusus Voss, 1926
- Paroplapoderus ornatus Schilsky in Kuster, 1903
- Paroplapoderus parbihumeratus Legalov, 2003
- Paroplapoderus pardalis Voss, 1926
- Paroplapoderus pardaloides Voss, 1926
- Paroplapoderus perakensis Voss, 1935
- Paroplapoderus proximus Voss, 1926
- Paroplapoderus punctatus Pic, 1923
- Paroplapoderus reductus Pic, 1923
- Paroplapoderus semiannulatus Voss, 1926
- Paroplapoderus shiguensis Legalov, 2007
- Paroplapoderus shirakii Kôno, 1930
- Paroplapoderus spiniferus Voss, 1926
- Paroplapoderus sticticus Voss, 1929
- Paroplapoderus subspinosus Voss, 1929
- Paroplapoderus tandjongicus Voss, 1926
- Paroplapoderus tanjongicus Voss, 1926
- Paroplapoderus tenebrosa Voss, 1929
- Paroplapoderus tentator Legalov, 2003
- Paroplapoderus tigrinus Dalla Torre & Voss, 1930
- Paroplapoderus tristis Schilsky in Kuster, 1903
- Paroplapoderus tristoides Voss, 1924
- Paroplapoderus tuberculatus Harold, 1878
- Paroplapoderus turbidus Voss, 1926
- Paroplapoderus tzinpinensis Legalov, 2007
- Paroplapoderus ulmi Kôno, 1929
- Paroplapoderus validus Voss, 1926
- Paroplapoderus vanvolxemi Voss, 1926
- Paroplapoderus varicollis Voss, 1926
- Paroplapoderus vitticeps Dalla Torre & Voss, 1930
