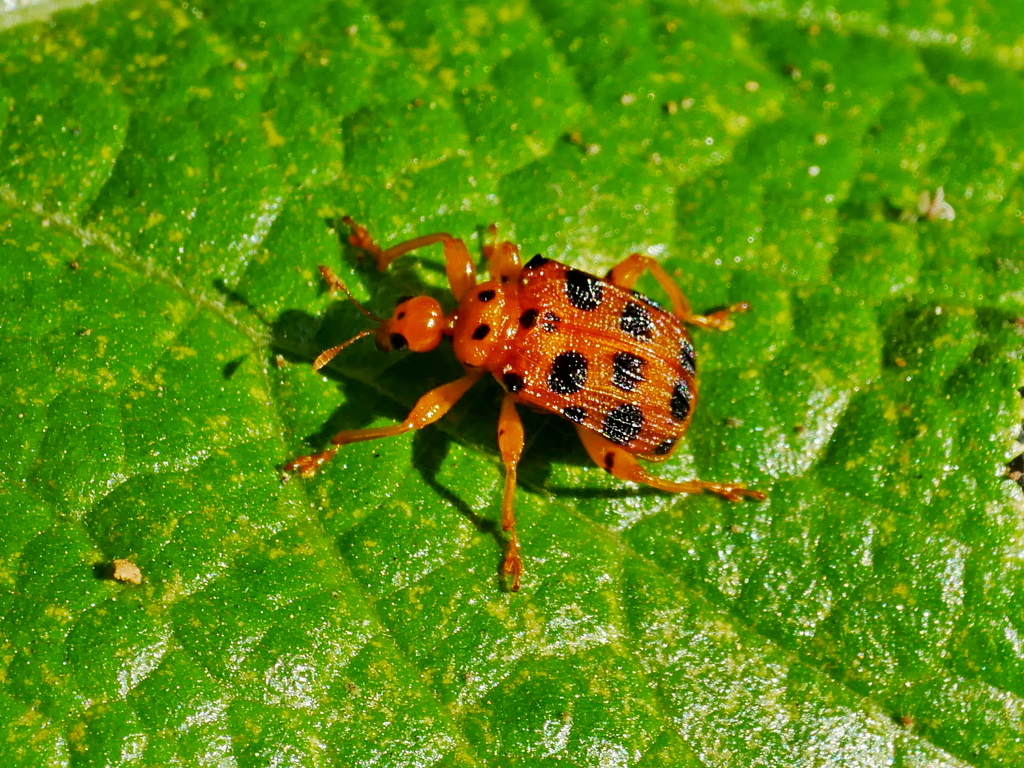
- A. pardaloides

Scientific classification
- Kingdom: Animalia
- Phylum: Arthropoda
- Clade: Pancrustacea
- Class: Insecta
- Order: Coleoptera
- Suborder: Polyphaga
- Infraorder: Cucujiformia
- Superfamily: Curculionoidea
- Family: Attelabidae
- Tribe: Hoplapoderini
- Genus: Agomadaranus; Voss, 1958

Synonyms
- Pseudmadaranus Legalov, 2003

= Agomadaranus =

Genus of beetles

Agomadaranus is a genus of leaf-rolling weevils in the subfamily Apoderinae.

== Distribution ==
The species in this genus are found across the Indian Subcontinent, Southeast Asia, and East Asia. The countries they have been found in are India (Kerala, West Bengal), Vietnam (Quảng Ngãi), China (Yunnan, Guangxi, Guangdong, Hainan, Fujian, Jiangxi, Zhejiang, Anhui, Jiangsu, Hubei, Shaanxi, Shanxi, Beijing, Liaoning), Hong Kong, Taiwan, Japan (Miyazaki, Fukuoka, Kochi, Kagawa, Fukui, Nagano, Yamanashi, Tokyo, Gunma), Indonesia (Central Java), and Malaysia (Sabah).

== Species ==
The following species belong to Agomadaranus.

- Agomadaranus amoenus Legalov, 2007
- Agomadaranus groenendaeli Legalov, 2007
- Agomadaranus jekeli Legalov, 2007
- Agomadaranus maculipes Legalov, 2007
- Agomadaranus pardaloides (Voss, 1924)
- Agomadaranus sarawakensis Legalov, 2007
- Agomadaranus xilingensis Legalov, 2007
