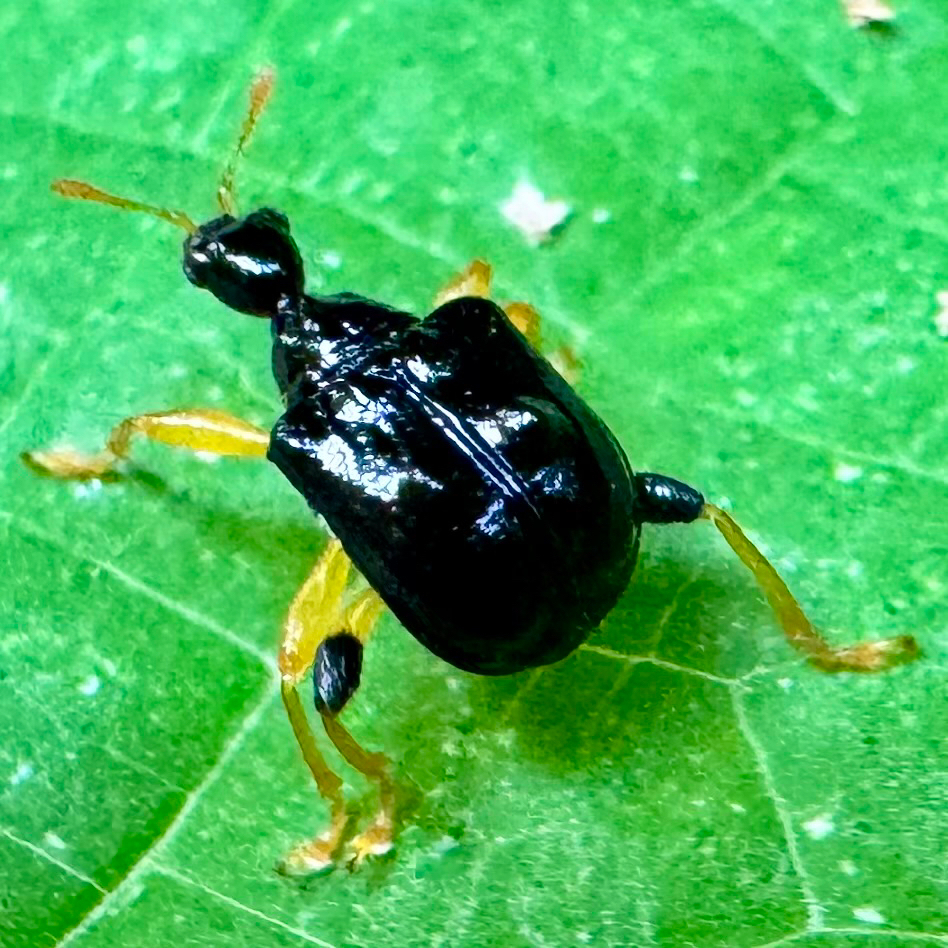
- Phymatapoderus flavimanus in Osaka, Japan
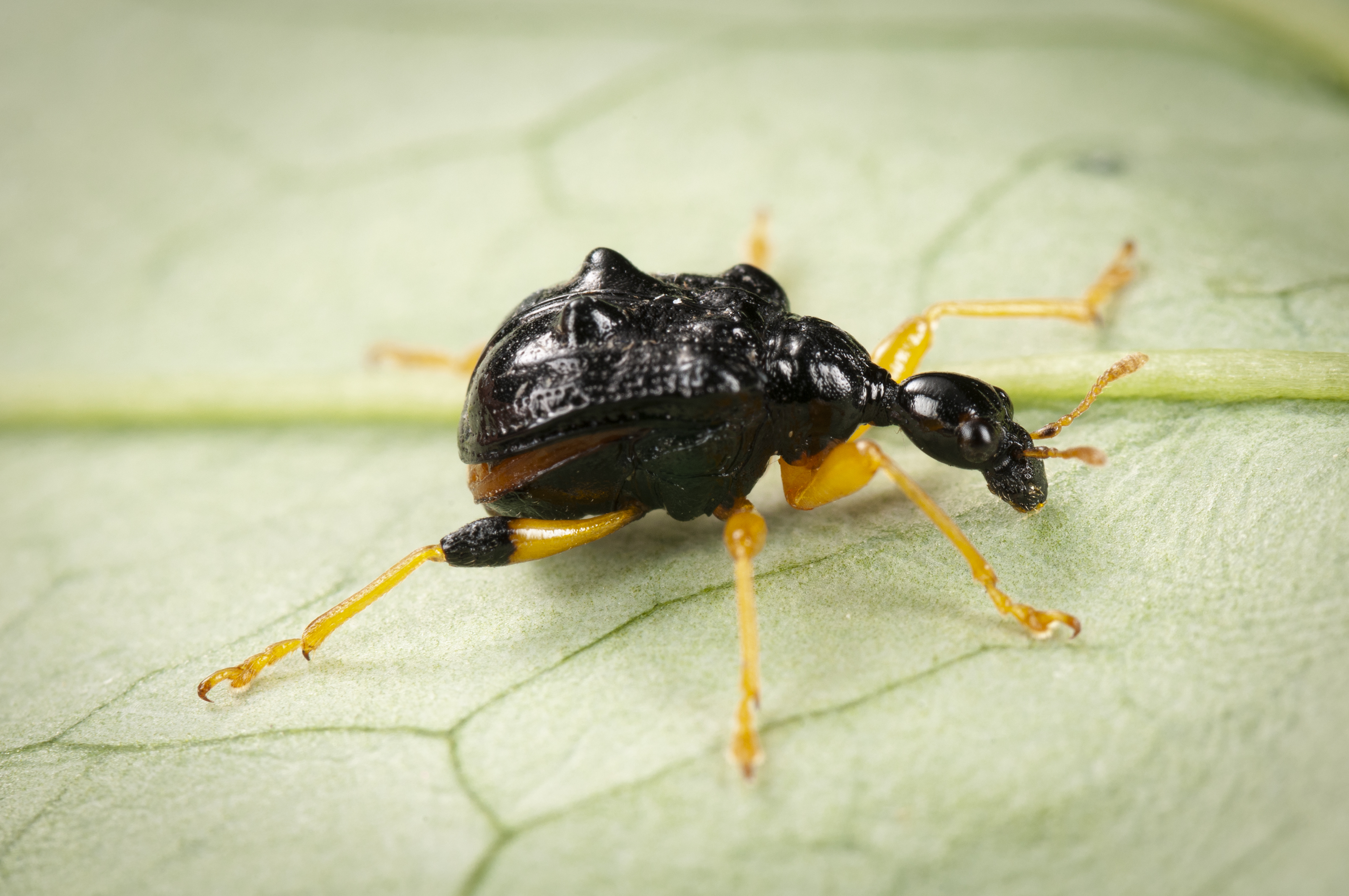
- Phymatopoderus flavimanus, Adult, South Korea

Scientific classification
- Kingdom: Animalia
- Phylum: Arthropoda
- Clade: Pancrustacea
- Class: Insecta
- Order: Coleoptera
- Suborder: Polyphaga
- Infraorder: Cucujiformia
- Superfamily: Curculionoidea
- Family: Attelabidae
- Subfamily: Apoderinae
- Tribe: Hoplapoderini
- Genus: Phymatapoderus; Voss, 1926

Synonyms
- Phymatopoderus Pic, 1928

= Phymatapoderus =

Genus of beetles

Phymatapoderus is a genus of leaf-roller weevils, family Attelabidae.

== Behaviors ==
Phymatapoderus pavens has been observed constructing two types of leaf rolls on the species Boehmeria japonica var. silvestrii, based on the shape of the leaf. The females make leaf rolls by using the whole leaf when small and weakly lobed, but when large and deeply lobed, they use one of the lateral lobes. Both of the observed types were found within a population of the species and served as a spot for offspring to grow. The weevils bite the veins of the leaf differently during constructing the leaf roll, suggesting that the type of leaf roll is determined before constructing.

== Distribution ==
Species in Phymatapoderus are mainly found in East Asia, with some found in Southeast Asia. They are found in Russia, Japan, South Korea, Taiwan, China, Vietnam, and Thailand.

== Species ==
There are 13 accepted species:

- Phymatapoderus elongaticeps Mshl., 1948
- Phymatapoderus elongatipes Voss, 1926
- Phymatapoderus euflavimanus Legalov, 2003
- Phymatapoderus flavimanus Legalov, 2003
- Phymatapoderus latipennis Legalov, 2003
- Phymatapoderus monstrosus Pic, 1928
- Phymatapoderus monticola Voss, 1926
- Phymatapoderus parelongatipes Legalov, 2003
- Phymatapoderus pavens Voss, 1926
- Phymatapoderus sitshuanensis Legalov, 2003
- Phymatapoderus subornatus Voss, 1926
- Phymatapoderus taiwanensis Legalov, 2003
- Phymatapoderus yunnanicus Voss, 1929

== Gallery ==
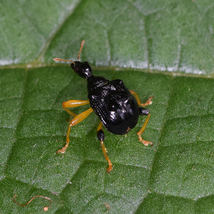
Phymatapoderus flavimanus in Seosan, South Korea

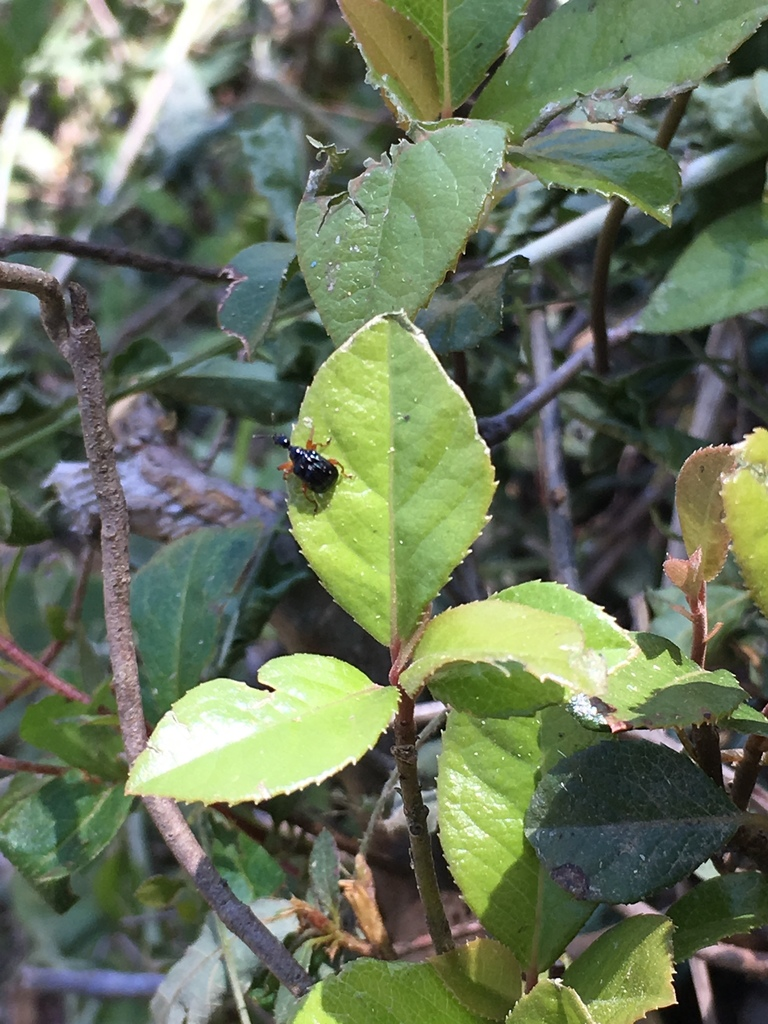
Phymatapoderus pavens in Echizen, Japan
