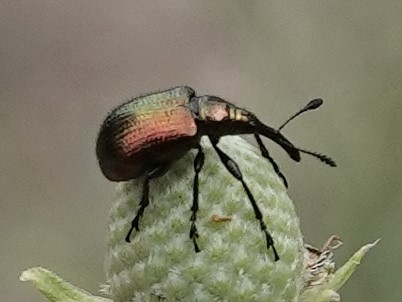

Scientific classification
- Kingdom: Animalia
- Phylum: Arthropoda
- Class: Insecta
- Order: Coleoptera
- Suborder: Polyphaga
- Infraorder: Cucujiformia
- Family: Attelabidae
- Genus: Haplorhynchites
- Species: H. eximius

Binomial name
- Haplorhynchites eximius (LeConte, 1876)

= Haplorhynchites eximius =

Species of beetle

Haplorhynchites eximius is a species of leaf rolling weevil in the beetle family Attelabidae. It is found in North America.
