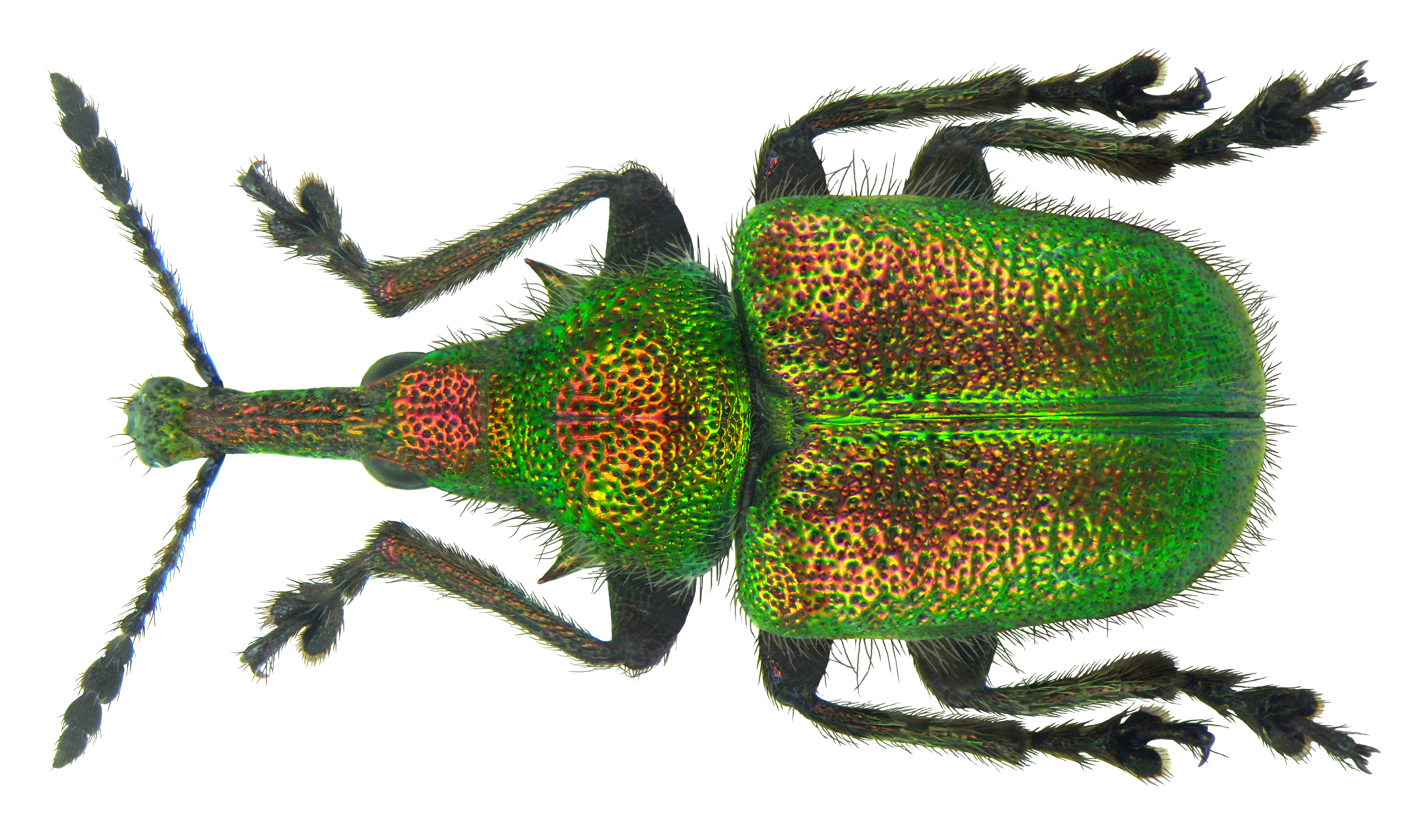

Scientific classification
- Kingdom: Animalia
- Phylum: Arthropoda
- Clade: Pancrustacea
- Class: Insecta
- Order: Coleoptera
- Suborder: Polyphaga
- Infraorder: Cucujiformia
- Family: Attelabidae
- Genus: Rhynchites
- Species: R. auratus

Binomial name
- Rhynchites auratus (Scopoli, 1763)

= Rhynchites auratus =

Species of beetle

Rhynchites auratus, sometimes called the apricot weevil, cherry-fruit weevil, or golden green snout weevil, is a species of weevil.

== Description ==
Adults measure 7–9 mm (0.28–0.35 in) in body length. Their bodies are golden-red in color, with their rostrums and legs brown. Larvae are 12 mm (0.47 in) and are white with brown heads. Adults feed on the flowers of cherry trees and other trees in the family Rosaceae. Adult females later bore holes into the fruits of these trees in which they will lay their eggs. In high densities, they are considered a serious orchard pest, causing damaged fruits to drop off of trees.
