= Homapoderus tamsi =

Scientific classification
- Kingdom: Animalia
- Phylum: Arthropoda
- Class: Insecta
- Order: Coleoptera
- Suborder: Polyphaga
- Infraorder: Cucujiformia
- Family: Attelabidae
- Genus: Homapoderus
- Species: H. tamsi

Binomial name
- Homapoderus tamsi {Voss, 1937)

Synonyms
- Parapoderus tamsi Voss, 1937

Species of beetle

Homapoderus tamsi is a species of weevils of the family Attelabidae. It occurs in Equatorial Guinea, the Democratic Republic of the Congo and the island of Príncipe in São Tomé and Príncipe. The species was described as Parapoderus tamsi in 1937. It was placed into the genus Homapoderus by Legalov in the mid-2000s.
