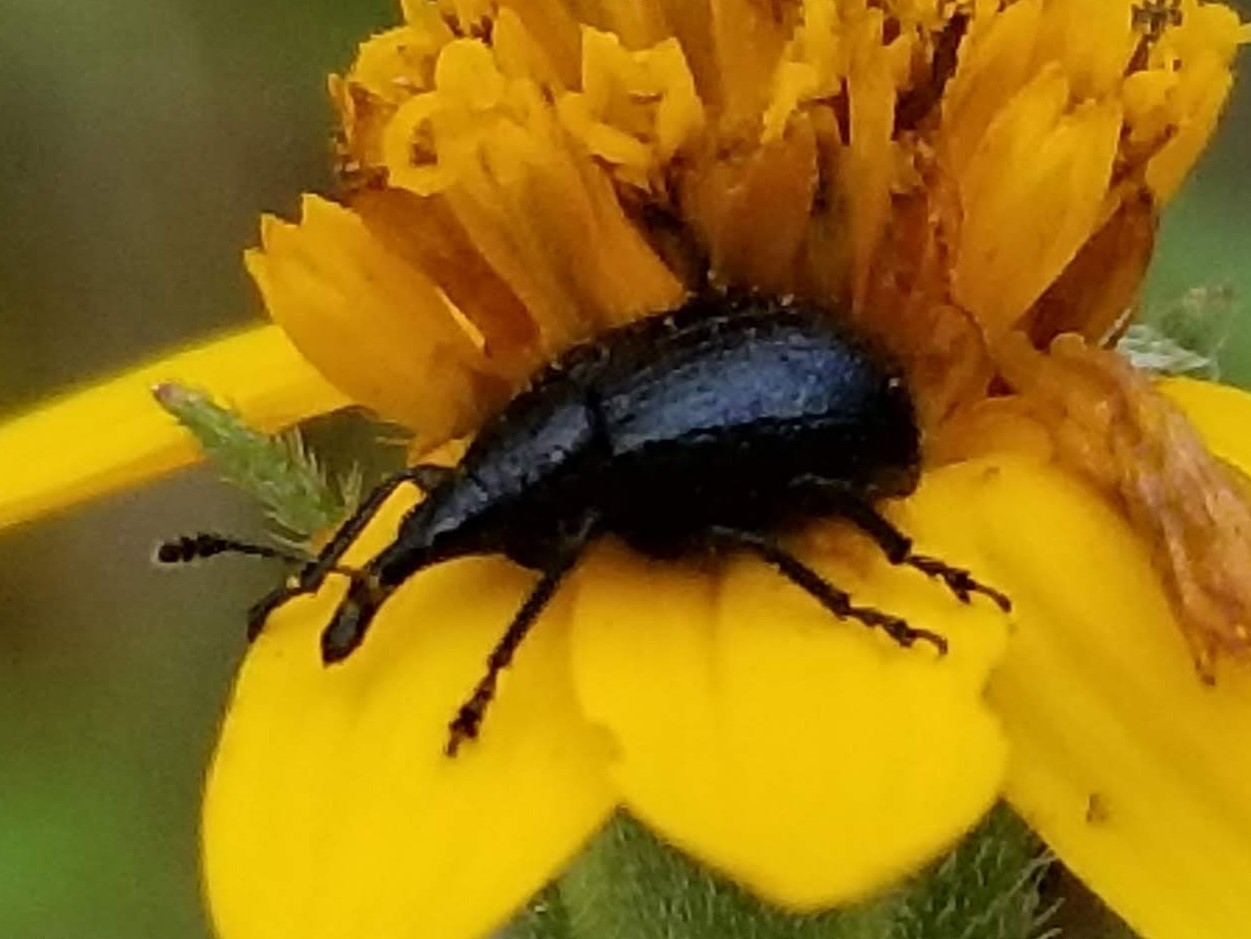
- Haplorhynchites pseudomexicanus

Scientific classification
- Domain: Eukaryota
- Kingdom: Animalia
- Phylum: Arthropoda
- Class: Insecta
- Order: Coleoptera
- Suborder: Polyphaga
- Infraorder: Cucujiformia
- Family: Attelabidae
- Tribe: Rhynchitini
- Genus: Haplorhynchites; Voss, 1924

= Haplorhynchites =

Genus of beetles

Haplorhynchites is a genus of leaf and bud weevils in the beetle family Attelabidae. There are ten species recognised in the genus Haplorhynchites.

== Species ==
These 10 species belong to the genus Haplorhynchites:

- Haplorhynchites adrienneae Hamilton, 1974
- Haplorhynchites aeneus (Boheman, 1829) (head-clipping weevil)
- Haplorhynchites eximius (LeConte, 1876)
- Haplorhynchites hampsoni Legalov, 2003
- Haplorhynchites malabarensis Legalov, 2003
- Haplorhynchites planifrons (LeConte, 1876)
- Haplorhynchites pseudomexicanus Hamilton, 1974
- Haplorhynchites quadripennis (Fall, 1929)
- Haplorhynchites viridanus Legalov, 2003
- Haplorhynchites viridirostris Legalov, 2007
