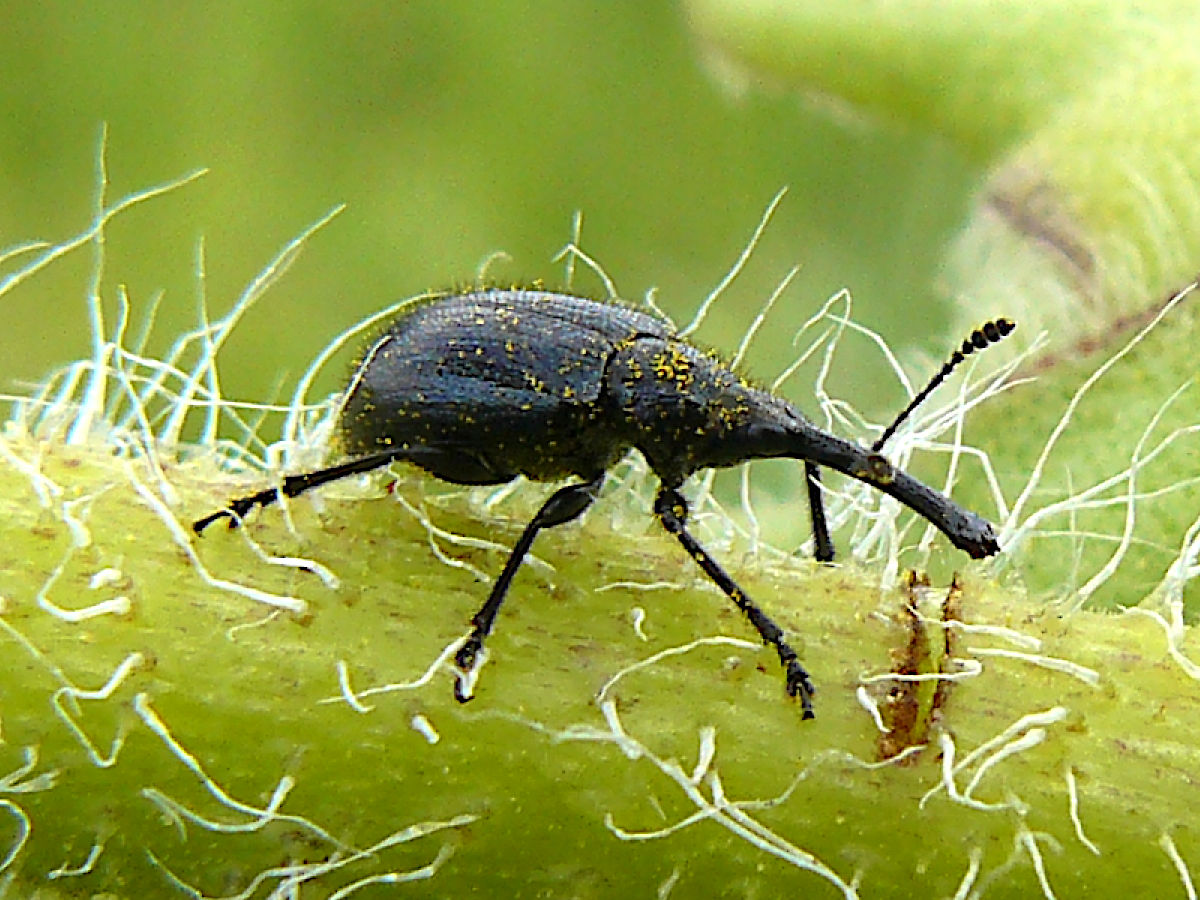

Scientific classification
- Kingdom: Animalia
- Phylum: Arthropoda
- Clade: Pancrustacea
- Class: Insecta
- Order: Coleoptera
- Suborder: Polyphaga
- Infraorder: Cucujiformia
- Superfamily: Curculionoidea
- Family: Attelabidae
- Genus: Haplorhynchites
- Species: H. aeneus

Binomial name
- Haplorhynchites aeneus (Boheman, 1829)

= Haplorhynchites aeneus =

Species of beetle

Haplorhynchites aeneus, known generally as the head-clipping weevil or sunflower headclipping weevil, is a species of leaf rolling weevil in the beetle family Attelabidae. It is found in North America.
