= Haplorhynchites planifrons =

Scientific classification
- Kingdom: Animalia
- Phylum: Arthropoda
- Class: Insecta
- Order: Coleoptera
- Suborder: Polyphaga
- Infraorder: Cucujiformia
- Family: Attelabidae
- Genus: Haplorhynchites
- Species: H. planifrons

Binomial name
- Haplorhynchites planifrons (LeConte, 1876)

Species of beetle

Haplorhynchites planifrons is a species of leaf rolling weevil in the beetle family Attelabidae. It is found in North America.
