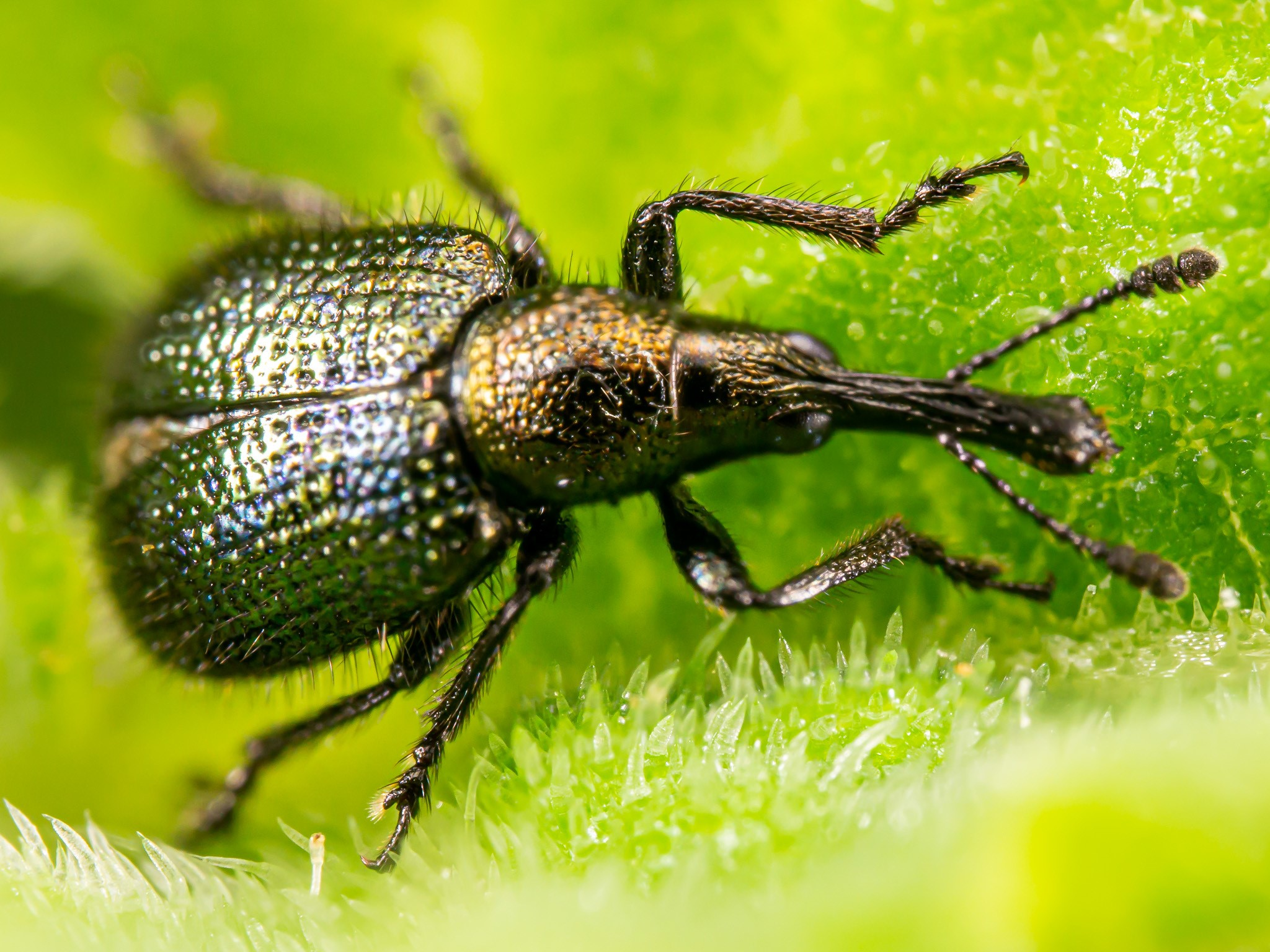

Scientific classification
- Domain: Eukaryota
- Kingdom: Animalia
- Phylum: Arthropoda
- Class: Insecta
- Order: Coleoptera
- Suborder: Polyphaga
- Infraorder: Cucujiformia
- Family: Attelabidae
- Genus: Haplorhynchites
- Species: H. quadripennis

Binomial name
- Haplorhynchites quadripennis (Fall, 1929)

= Haplorhynchites quadripennis =

Species of beetle

Haplorhynchites quadripennis is a species of leaf rolling weevil in the beetle family Attelabidae. It is found in North America.
