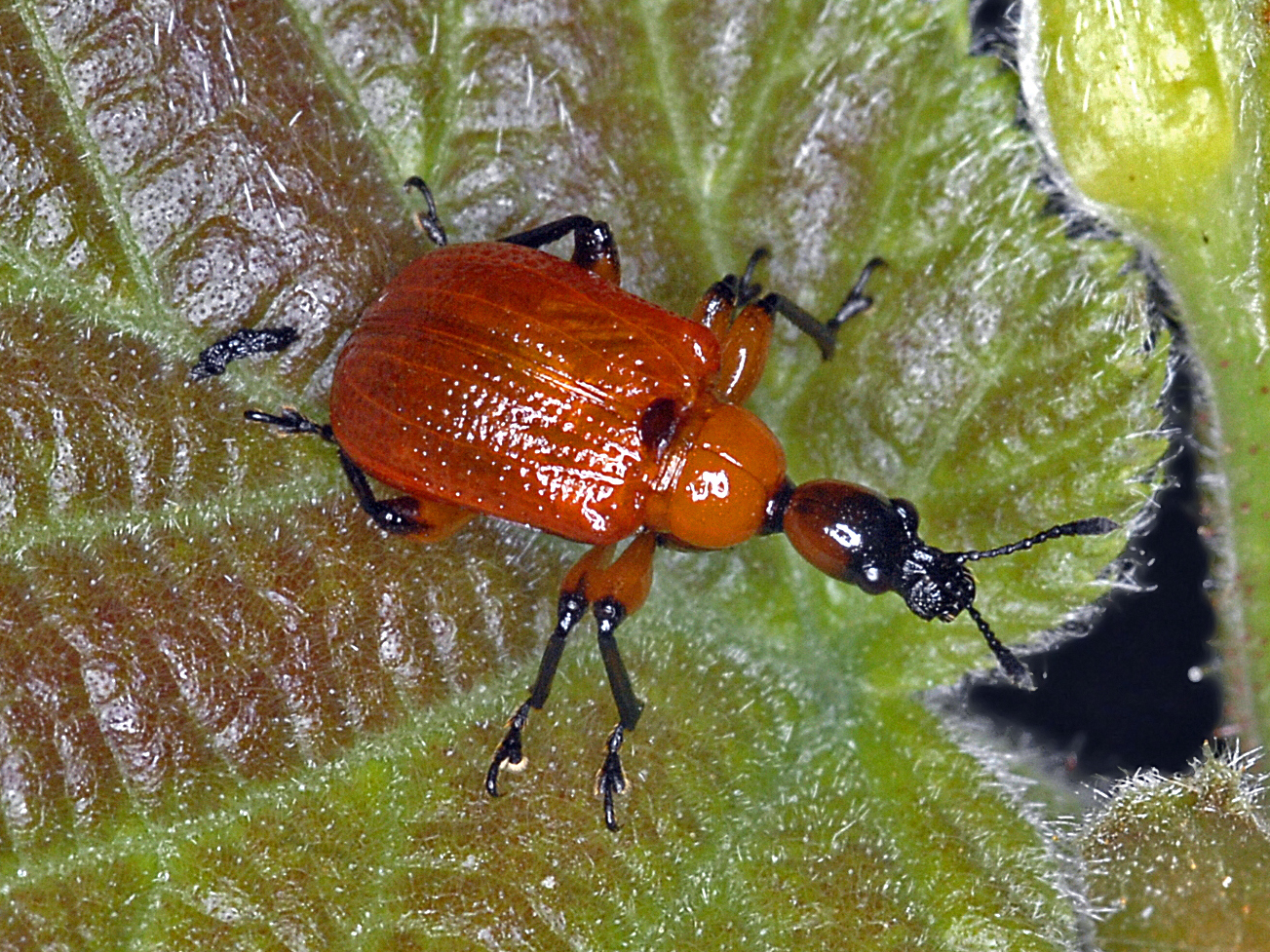
- Dorsal view
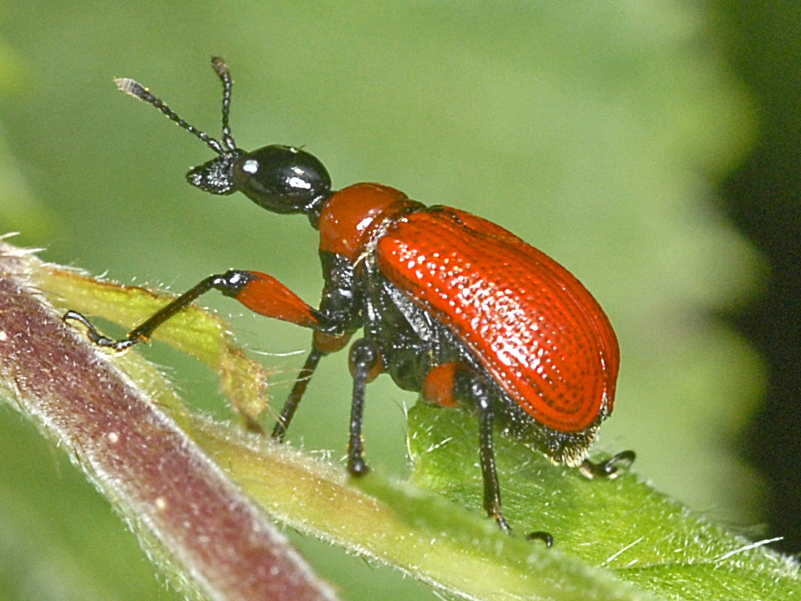
- Side view

Scientific classification
- Kingdom: Animalia
- Phylum: Arthropoda
- Clade: Pancrustacea
- Class: Insecta
- Order: Coleoptera
- Suborder: Polyphaga
- Infraorder: Cucujiformia
- Family: Attelabidae
- Genus: Apoderus
- Species: A. coryli

Binomial name
- Apoderus coryli (Linnaeus, 1758)

Synonyms
- Attelabus coryli Linnaeus, 1758

= Apoderus coryli =

Species of beetle

Apoderus coryli, the hazel-leaf roller weevil, is a species of leaf-rolling beetles belonging to the family Attelabidae subfamily Attelabinae. Because of the trunk-like elongated head, it is often mistakenly attributed to the weevil family Curculionidae.

== Distribution ==
This species is widespread in most of Europe (Albania, Austria, Belarus, Belgium, Bulgaria, Croatia, Czech Republic, Denmark, Estonia, Finland, France, Germany, Greece, Hungary, Italy, Luxembourg, Slovakia, United Kingdom), in the eastern Palearctic realm (China and Japan), and in the Near East.

== Habitat ==
Apoderus coryli prefers deciduous forests, especially at forest edges, but also parks and gardens where the host plant, Corylus avellana, occurs.

== Description ==
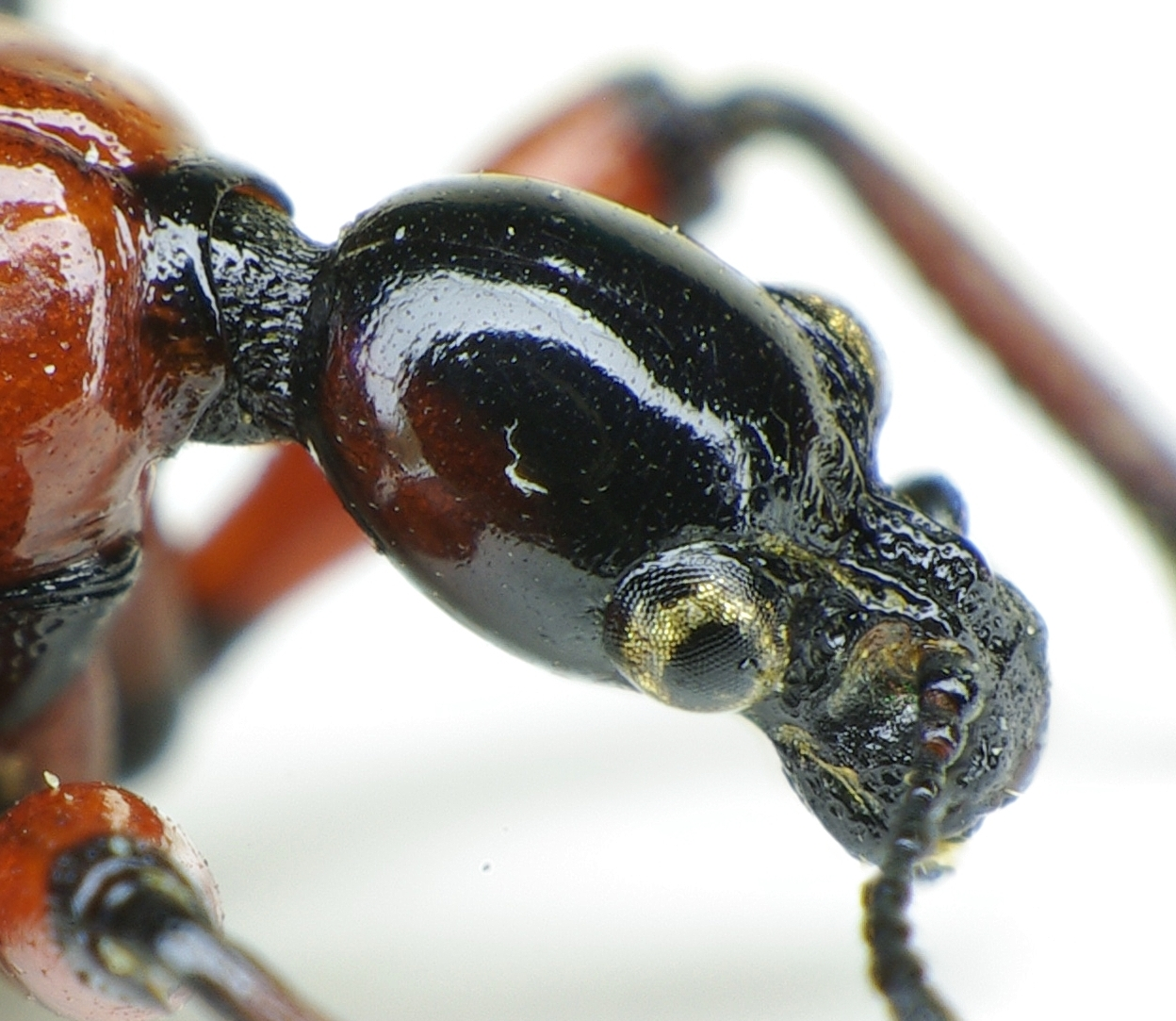
Close-up of the head

Apoderus coryli can reach a length of 6–8 millimetres (0.24–0.31 in). These primitive weevils have a red shiny bell-shaped pronotum, a shiny black or dark brown head with protruding eyes, a distinct neck and short and rounded elytra. Their straight antennae are inserted near the base of the rostrum. The prothorax is much narrower than the base of the elytra on the abdomen. The scutellum is broad, triangular to trapezoidal and without stripes. The legs are red at the base, black towards the end.

Larvae can reach approximately a body length of 10 millimetres (0.39 in). They are bright orange with a brown head. Also pupae are orange and reach a length of about 6–8 millimetres (0.24–0.31 in).

This species is rather similar to the oak roller weevil (Attelabus nitens) and Apoderus erythropterus, that shows a black pronotum. All three species produce leaf wraps into which the eggs are laid.

== Biology ==
Adults can be found between May and September. They feed on leaves of the host plant, the hazel (Corylus avellana), hence the Latin name coryli of the species, meaning hazelnut. Only in exceptional cases other deciduous trees, such as alder (Alnus species), birch (Betula species), common hornbeam (Carpinus betulus), common beech (Fagus sylvatica) and hop-hornbeam (Ostrya carpinifolia) are used as host plants.

== Behavior ==
After mating in May–June the females cut slits into leaves and rolls up these leaves into cigar-shaped cylinders or ‘cradles’. Then they lay 5 to 6 yellowish eggs inside them, through a hole made with the rostrum. The time of oviposition may take several weeks. Several cylinders per day are produced. The developing larvae will feed and pupate in these the leaf wraps. The new adult beetles will emerge in the summer (at the end of June or early of August). There are two generations per year (bivoltine species). The larvae of the second generation overwinter in said cylinders and pupate in the spring.

== Gallery ==
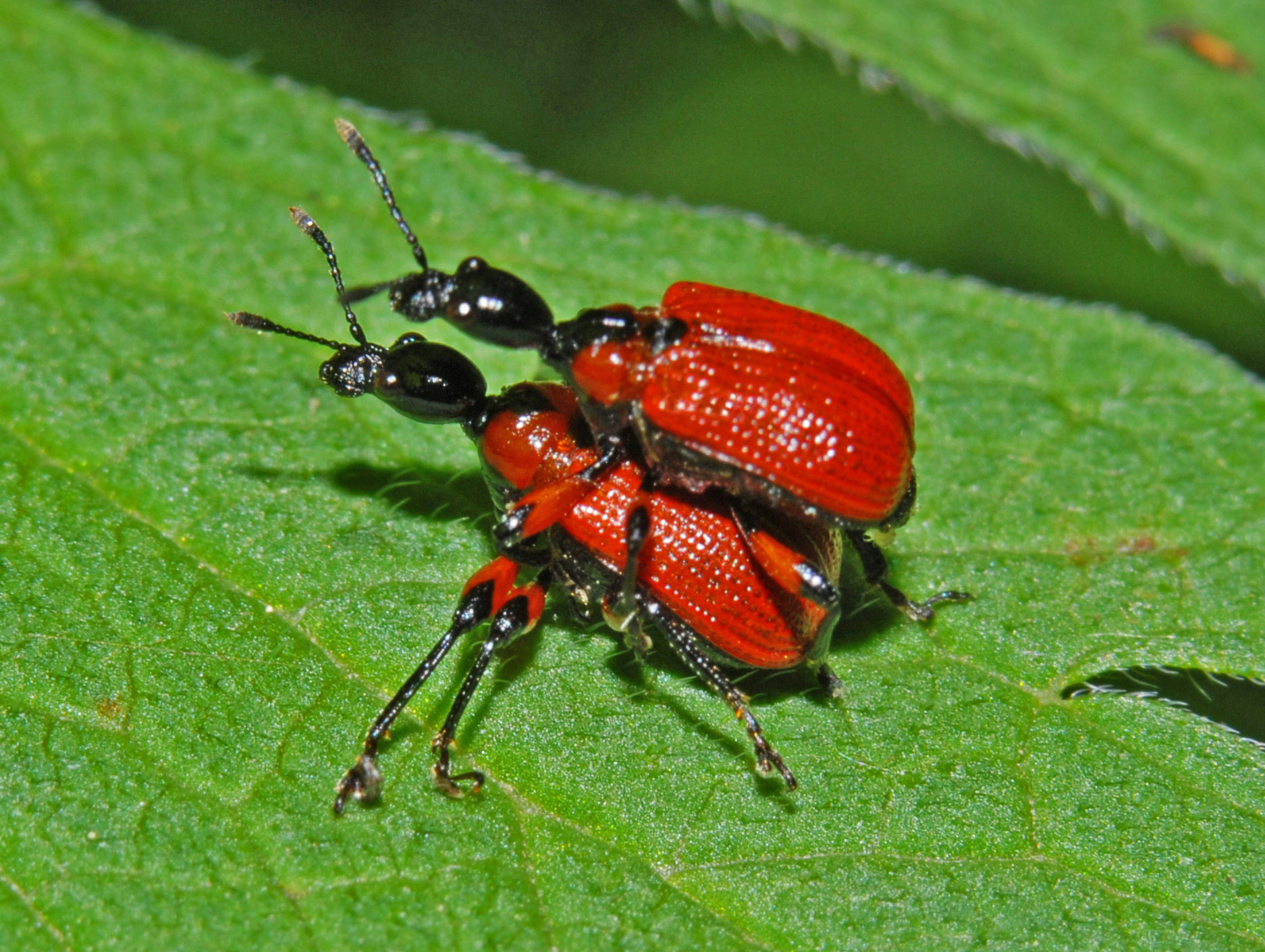
Mating couple of Apoderus coryli

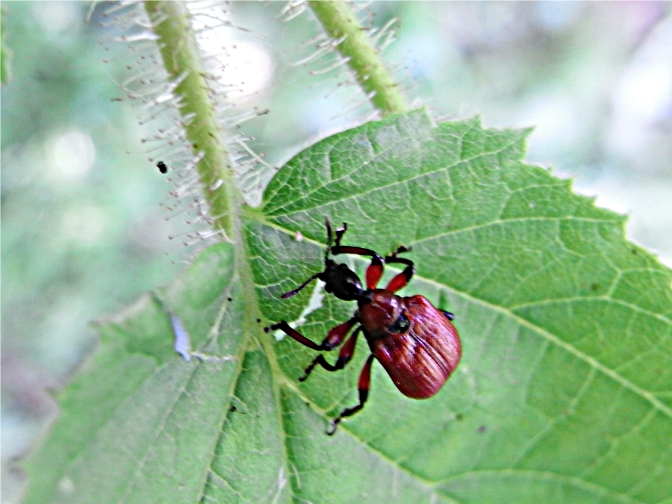
Female starting cut near leaf stalk

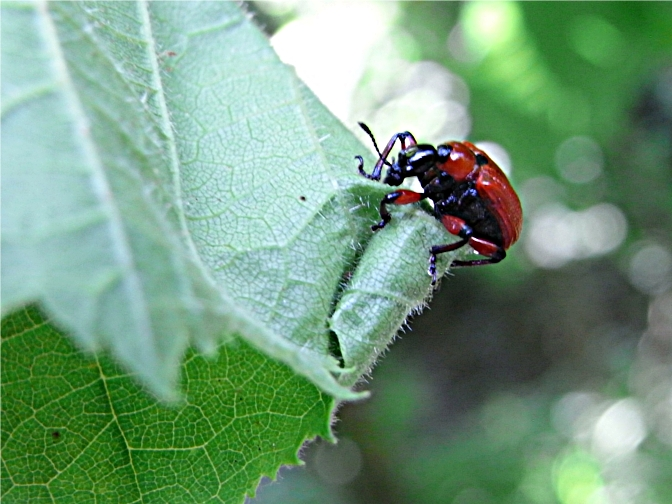
Starting rolling

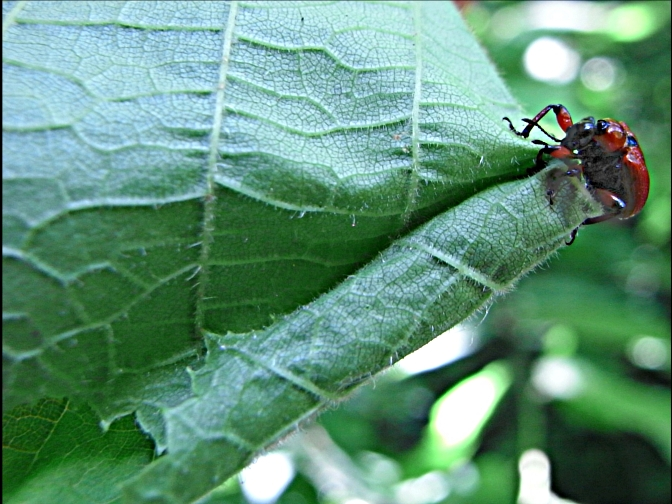
Continuing rolling

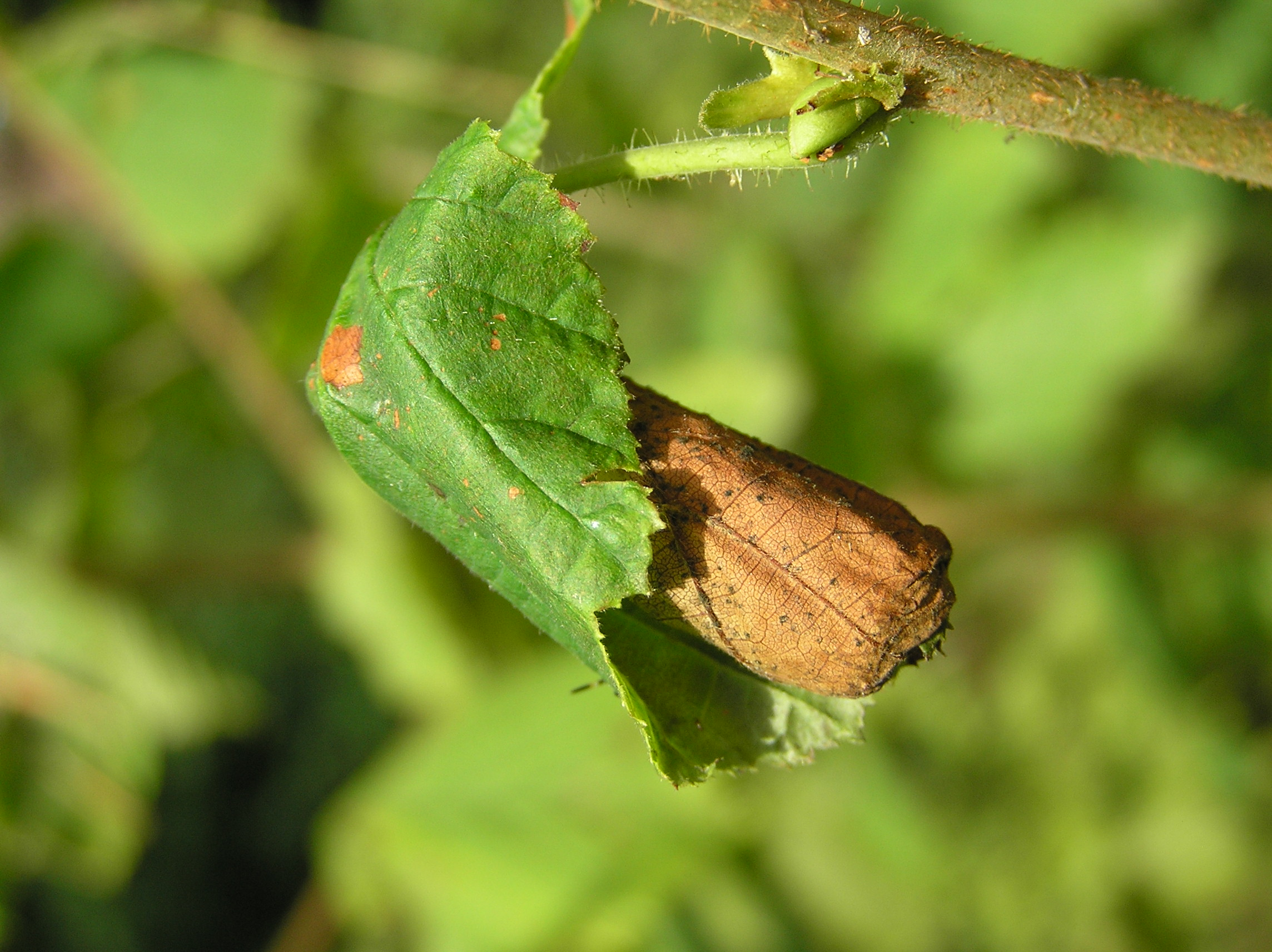
Completed roll

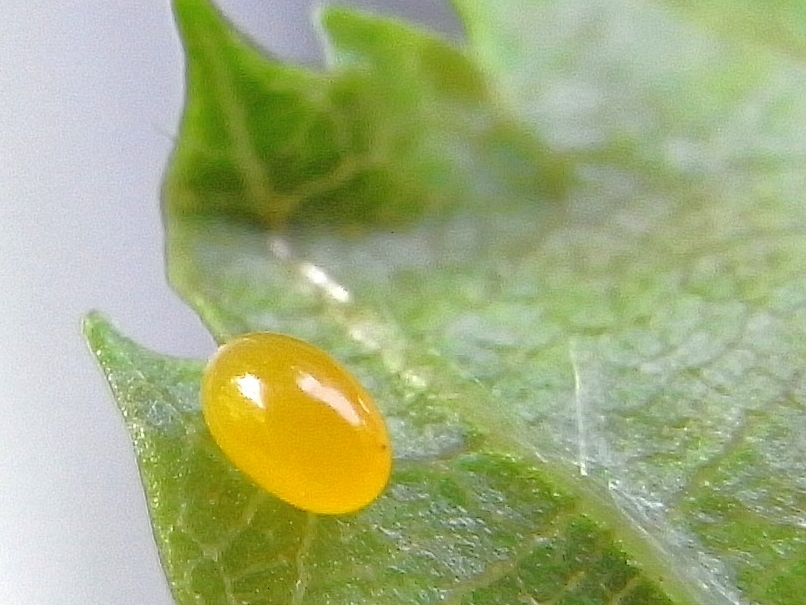
Egg laid inside the roll
