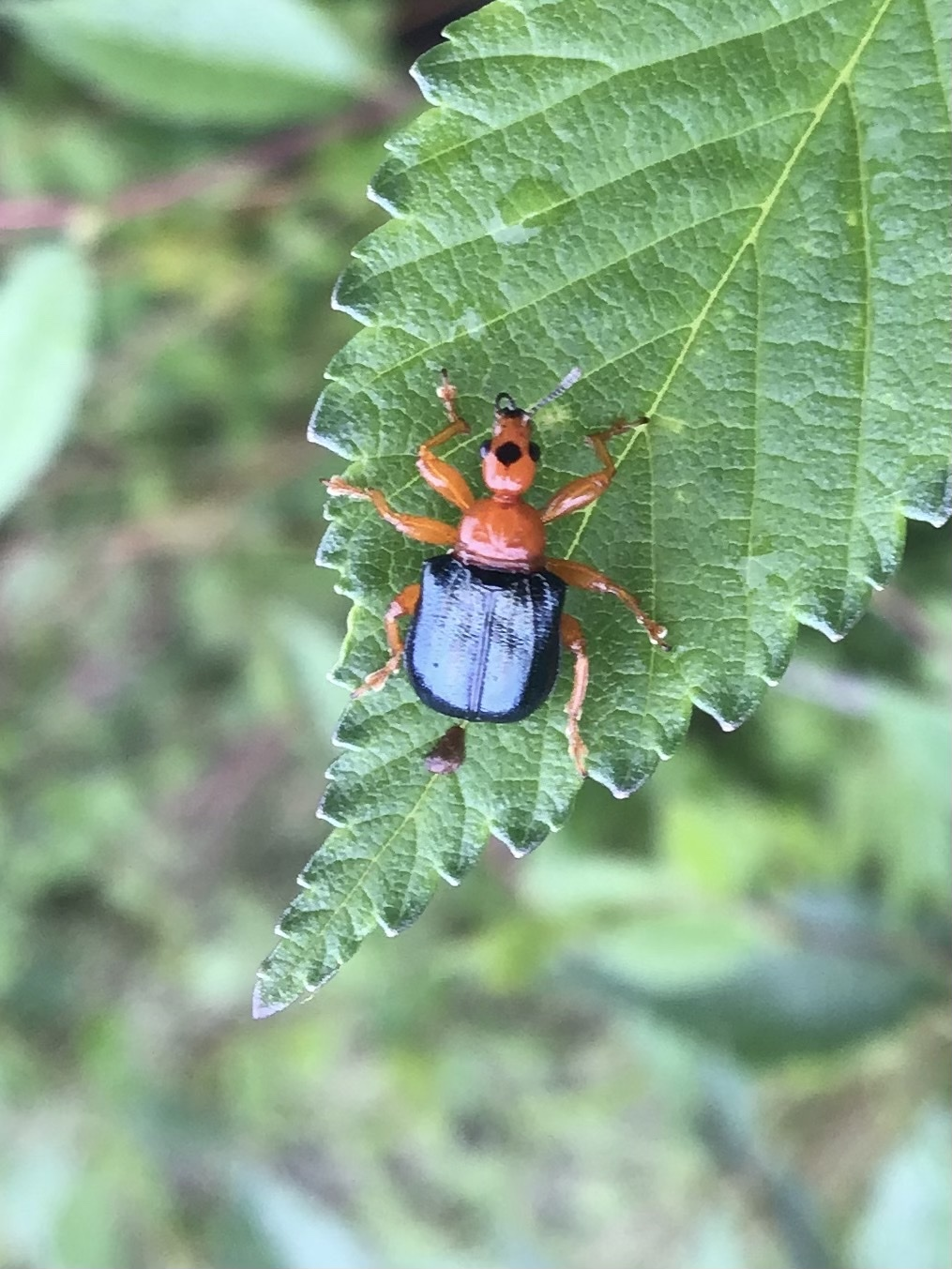
- T. ruficollis

Scientific classification
- Kingdom: Animalia
- Phylum: Arthropoda
- Clade: Pancrustacea
- Class: Insecta
- Order: Coleoptera
- Suborder: Polyphaga
- Infraorder: Cucujiformia
- Superfamily: Curculionoidea
- Family: Attelabidae
- Tribe: Hoplapoderini
- Genus: Tomapoderus; Voss, 1926

Subgenera
- Tomapoderus (Pseudapoderus); Tomapoderus (Tomapoderus)

= Tomapoderus =

Genus of beetles

Tomapoderus is a genus in the family Attelabidae, the leaf-rolling weevils. Species in this genus are native to China and South Korea. They have also been found in India, Thailand, and Russia.

== Species ==
The recognized species in this genus are:

- Tomapoderus aethiopicus Voss, 1926
- Tomapoderus clitostyloides Voss, 1943
- Tomapoderus coeruleipennis Voss, 1926
- Tomapoderus cyclops Faust, 1894
- Tomapoderus diversicornis Pic, 1928
- Tomapoderus dohertyi Voss, 1935
- Tomapoderus flaviceps Voss, 1926
- Tomapoderus flavirostris Voss, 1926
- Tomapoderus flavus Voss, 1930
- Tomapoderus ghesquierei Voss, 1939
- Tomapoderus himalayensis Alonso-Zarazaga in Löbl & Smetana, 2011
- Tomapoderus lepidulus Janczyk, 1960
- Tomapoderus maculaticeps Pic, 1928
- Tomapoderus maculiceps Pic, 1928
- Tomapoderus melanopus Voss, 1928
- Tomapoderus melli Voss, 1926
- Tomapoderus nigrosculpturatus Janczyk, 1960
- Tomapoderus orientalis Alonso-Zarazaga in Löbl & Smetana, 2011
- Tomapoderus persimilis Voss, 1937
- Tomapoderus philippinensis Janczyk, 1960
- Tomapoderus pici Alonso-Zarazaga in Löbl & Smetana, 2011
- Tomapoderus ruficeps Voss, 1926
- Tomapoderus ruficollis (J.C. Fabricius, 1781)
- Tomapoderus serrirostris (Lund, 1800)
- Tomapoderus subconicollis Voss, 1926
- Tomapoderus tenuicola Voss, 1926
- Tomapoderus testaceimembris Pic, 1928
- Tomapoderus testaceus Voss, 1937
- Tomapoderus tonkinea Voss, 1943
- Tomapoderus tsuchiyamai Kôno, 1941
- Tomapoderus unguicularis Voss, 1937
