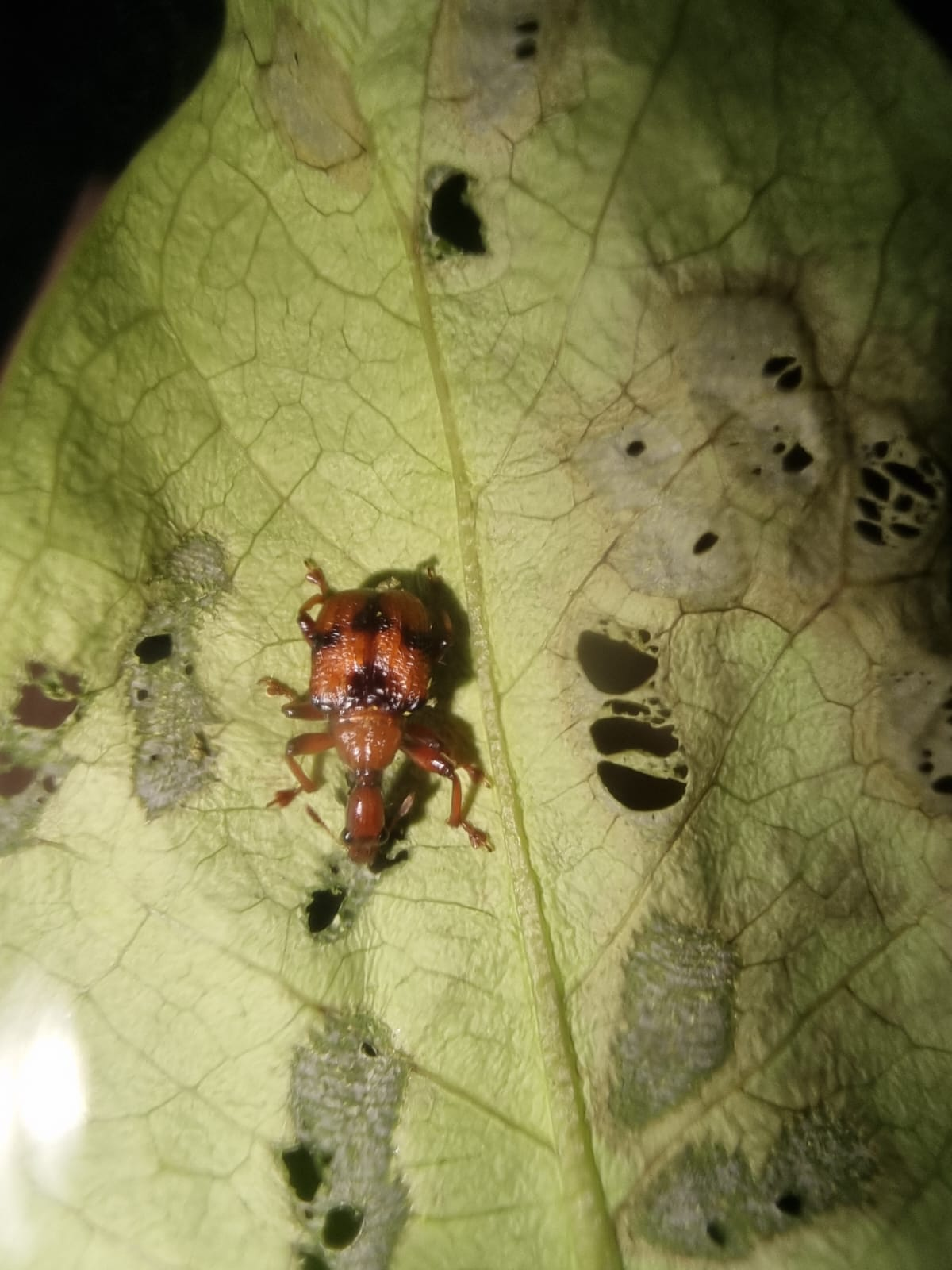
- Strigapoderus javanicus eating Syzygium sp.

Scientific classification
- Kingdom: Animalia
- Phylum: Arthropoda
- Class: Insecta
- Order: Coleoptera
- Suborder: Polyphaga
- Infraorder: Cucujiformia
- Family: Attelabidae
- Subfamily: Apoderinae
- Genus: Strigapoderus; H.Jekel, 1860

= Strigapoderus =

Genus of insects

Strigapoderus is a genus of leaf-rolling weevils in the beetle subfamily Attelabinae.

== Species ==
There are eleven species assigned to this genus:

- Strigapoderus ateroides Legalov, 2002
- Strigapoderus ceylonicus Legalov, 2007
- Strigapoderus indicus Legalov, 2003
- Strigapoderus javanicus Legalov, 2003
- Strigapoderus laosensis Legalov, 2003
- Strigapoderus malabarensis Legalov, 2003
- Strigapoderus nelligrinus Legalov, 2003
- Strigapoderus palliolatus Legalov, 2003
- Strigapoderus scabrosus Legalov, 2003
- Strigapoderus subvariolaris Legalov, 2003
- Strigapoderus tranquebaricus (J.C.Fabricius, 1798)
