= Rhynchites velatus =

Scientific classification
- Kingdom: Animalia
- Phylum: Arthropoda
- Class: Insecta
- Order: Coleoptera
- Suborder: Polyphaga
- Infraorder: Cucujiformia
- Family: Attelabidae
- Genus: Rhynchites
- Species: R. velatus

Binomial name
- Rhynchites velatus LeConte, 1880

Species of beetle

Rhynchites velatus is a species of leaf rolling weevil in the beetle family Attelabidae. It is found in North America.
