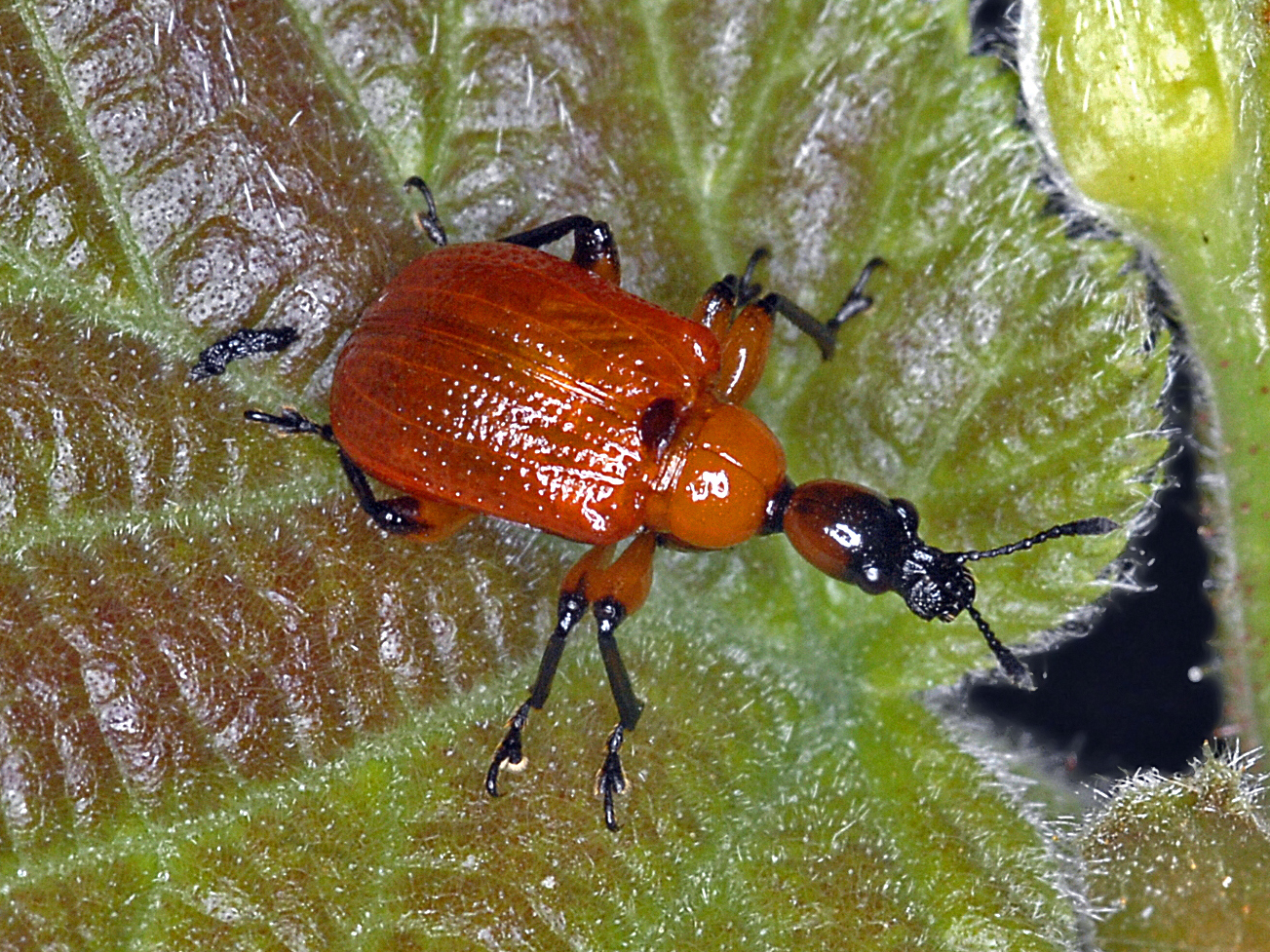
- Apoderus coryli, dorsal view

Scientific classification
- Kingdom: Animalia
- Phylum: Arthropoda
- Clade: Pancrustacea
- Class: Insecta
- Order: Coleoptera
- Suborder: Polyphaga
- Infraorder: Cucujiformia
- Superfamily: Curculionoidea
- Family: Attelabidae
- Subfamily: Apoderinae
- Genus: Apoderus; Olivier, 1807

= Apoderus =

Genus of beetles

Apoderus is a genus of leaf-rolling beetles belonging to the family Attelabidae.

== Selected species ==
- Apoderus coryli (Linnaeus, 1758) - hazel leaf-roller weevil
- Apoderus erythropterus (Zschach, 1788)
