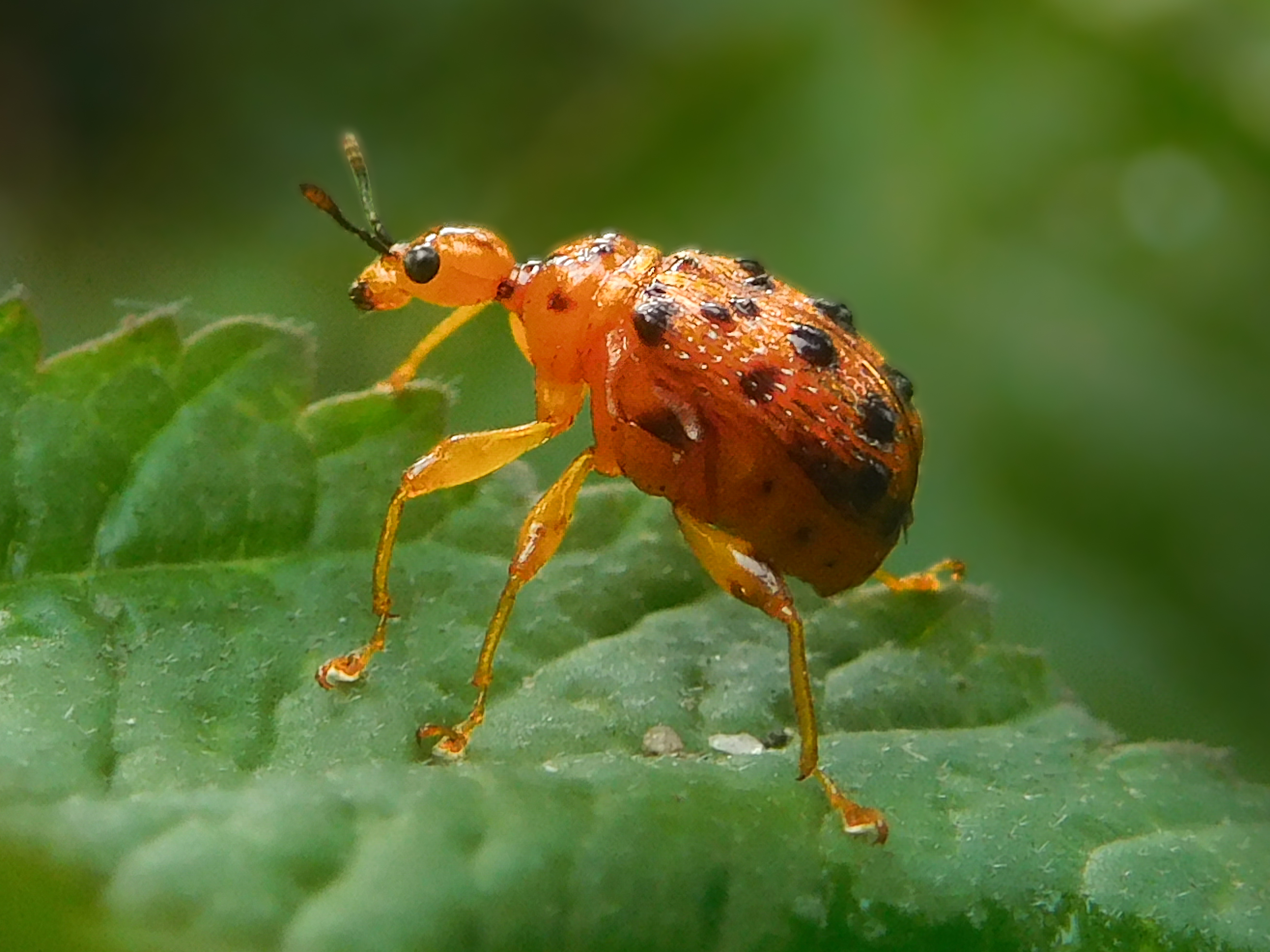
- Hoplapoderus sp.

Scientific classification
- Kingdom: Animalia
- Phylum: Arthropoda
- Clade: Pancrustacea
- Class: Insecta
- Order: Coleoptera
- Suborder: Polyphaga
- Infraorder: Cucujiformia
- Superfamily: Curculionoidea
- Family: Attelabidae
- Subfamily: Apoderinae
- Genus: Hoplapoderus; Jekel, 1860

= Hoplapoderus =

Genus of insects

Hoplapoderus is a genus of attelabid weevil. Species in the genus are found mainly in Southeast Asia and South Asia. The pronotum typically has a pair of spines or protuberances and the vertex of the scutellum is conical. The elytra also have spines or protuberances.

Species in the genus include:

- Hoplapoderus aculeatus Faust, 1899
- Hoplapoderus borneoensis Voss, 1926
- Hoplapoderus caliginosus (Faust, 1894)
- Hoplapoderus chevrolati Faust, 1891
- Hoplapoderus echinatoides Legalov, 2003
- Hoplapoderus echinatus (Gyllenhal, 1833)
- Hoplapoderus gemmatus (Thunberg, 1784)
- Hoplapoderus gemmosus (Jekel, 1860)
- Hoplapoderus hystrix (Fabricius, 1801)
- Hoplapoderus jekeli Legalov, 2007
- Hoplapoderus nepalensis Voss, 1926
- Hoplapoderus orientalis Voss, 1926
- Hoplapoderus pardaloides Voss, 1924
- Hoplapoderus penangincola Voss, 1928
- Hoplapoderus tristoides Voss, 1924
- Hoplapoderus vanvolxemi Roelofs, 1875
