= Homapoderus =

Scientific classification
- Kingdom: Animalia
- Phylum: Arthropoda
- Class: Insecta
- Order: Coleoptera
- Suborder: Polyphaga
- Infraorder: Cucujiformia
- Family: Attelabidae
- Genus: Homapoderus; Legalov, 2003

Genus of beetles

Homapoderus is a genus of weevils in the family Attelabidae. The genus was named and described by Legalov in 2003.

== Species ==
- Homapoderus angustifrons (Voss, 1926)
- Homapoderus anxius (Faust, 1894)
- Homapoderus arboretum (Kolbe, 1898)
- Homapoderus ashantensis Legalov, 2007
- Homapoderus benitoensis Legalov, 2003
- Homapoderus bicolor Legalov, 2007
- Homapoderus centralafricanus Legalov, 2007
- Homapoderus cephalotes Legalov, 2003
- Homapoderus clivicollis Legalov, 2003
- Homapoderus collarti Legalov, 2007
- Homapoderus congener (Voss, 1929)
- Homapoderus congoanus (Voss, 1937)
- Homapoderus conradti (Faust, 1898)
- Homapoderus convexus Legalov, 2007
- Homapoderus corallinus (Voss, 1926)
- Homapoderus crispipennis Legalov, 2003
- Homapoderus cyaneus (Gyllenhal, 1839)
- Homapoderus deceptor (Voss, 1926)
- Homapoderus denticulatus (Voss, 1926)
- Homapoderus diffinis (Voss, 1933)
- Homapoderus distinguendulus (Voss, 1926)
- Homapoderus dualaicus (Voss, 1926)
- Homapoderus equateurensis Legalov, 2007
- Homapoderus flavobasis (Voss, 1926)
- Homapoderus flavoides Legalov, 2007
- Homapoderus foveolatoides Legalov, 2007
- Homapoderus foveolatus (Voss, 1926)
- Homapoderus fuscicornis (Fabricius, 1792)
- Homapoderus ghanensis Legalov, 2007
- Homapoderus goellneri Legalov, 2007
- Homapoderus gyllenhali Alonso-Zarazaga
- Homapoderus haemopterus (Voss, 1926)
- Homapoderus hemixanthocnemis (Voss, 1926)
- Homapoderus isabellinus (Voss, 1926)
- Homapoderus ituriensis (Voss, 1944)
- Homapoderus kamerunensis Legalov, 2007
- Homapoderus lepersonneae (Voss, 1944)
- Homapoderus lubutuensis Legalov, 2007
- Homapoderus luluanus Legalov, 2003
- Homapoderus melanocnemis (Voss, 1926)
- Homapoderus mirabilis Legalov, 2007
- Homapoderus murzini Legalov, 2007
- Homapoderus neisabellinus Legalov, 2007
- Homapoderus nigritarsis (Voss, 1926)
- Homapoderus nigroscutellaris (Voss, 1926)
- Homapoderus occidentalis Legalov, 2007
- Homapoderus ochrobasis (Voss, 1926)
- Homapoderus panganicus Legalov, 2003
- Homapoderus patricius Legalov, 2003
- Homapoderus pseudotolerans (Voss, 1926)
- Homapoderus pseudovitreus (Voss, 1926)
- Homapoderus robustidorsalis (Voss, 1926)
- Homapoderus rufoapicalis Legalov, 2003
- Homapoderus semipallens (Faust, 1898)
- Homapoderus sylvaticus Legalov, 2003
- Homapoderus tamsi (Voss, 1937)
- Homapoderus tolerans (Faust, 1894)
- Homapoderus trigonocephalus Legalov, 2003
- Homapoderus ugandensis Legalov, 2007
- Homapoderus vitreus (Faust, 1898)
- Homapoderus zairicus Legalov, 2007
