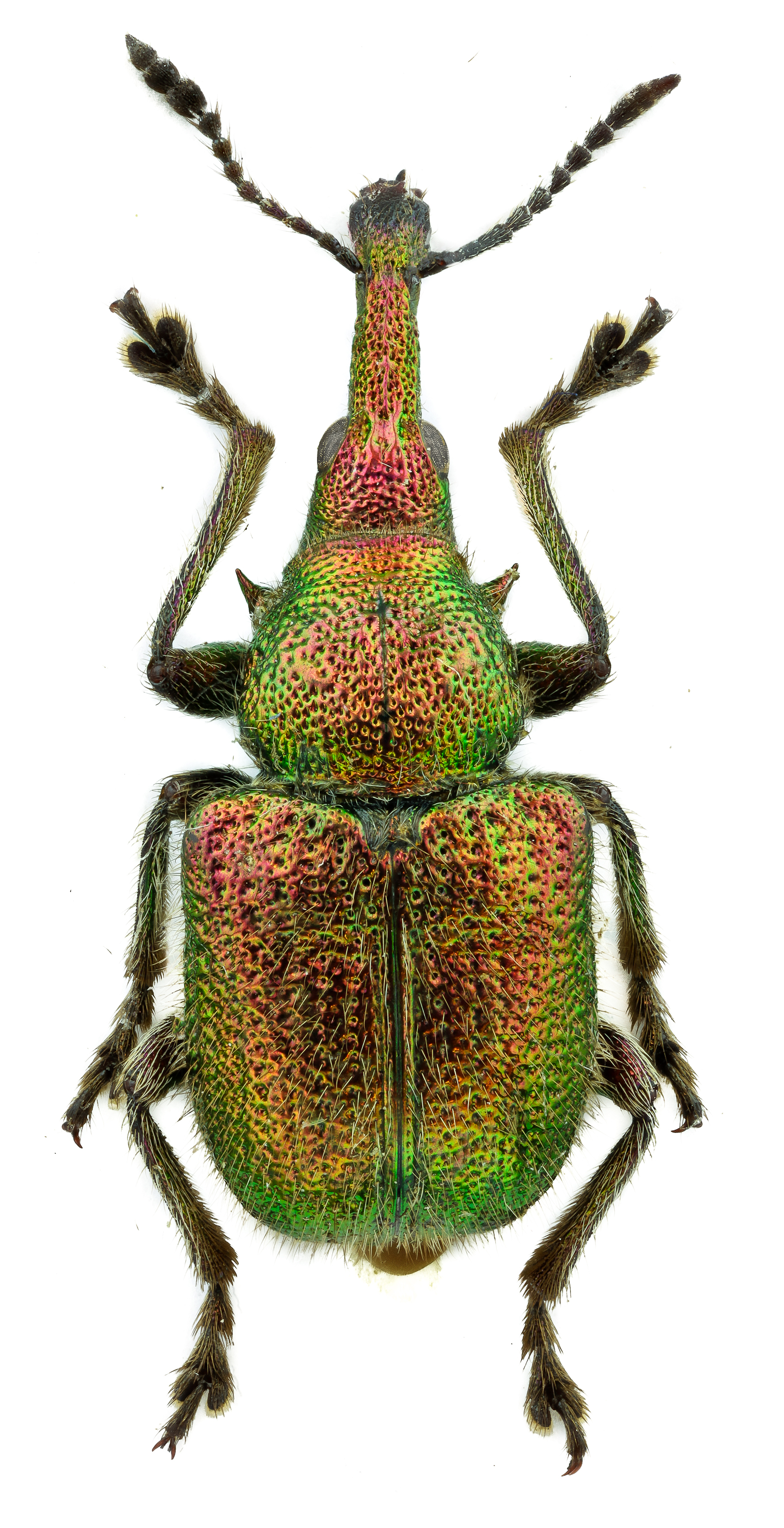
- Rhynchites auratus

Scientific classification
- Domain: Eukaryota
- Kingdom: Animalia
- Phylum: Arthropoda
- Class: Insecta
- Order: Coleoptera
- Suborder: Polyphaga
- Infraorder: Cucujiformia
- Family: Attelabidae
- Tribe: Rhynchitini
- Genus: Rhynchites; Schneider, 1791

= Rhynchites =

Genus of beetles

Rhynchites is a genus of leaf and bud weevils in the family of beetles known as Attelabidae.

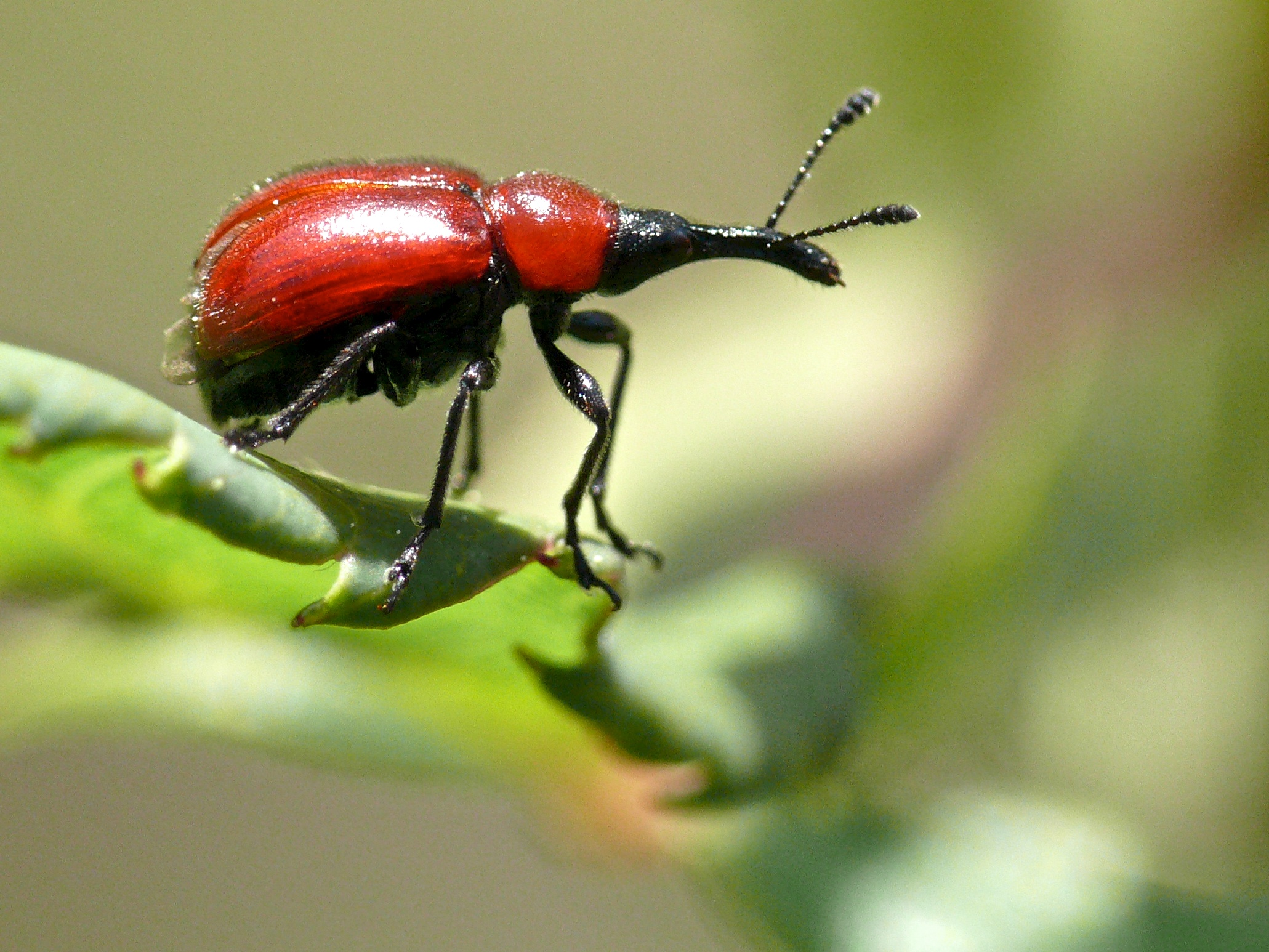

== Species ==
These nine species belong to the genus Rhynchites:

- Rhynchites auratus Schoenherr, 1833^{c g}
- Rhynchites bellus (Legalov & Fremuth, 2002)^{g}
- Rhynchites dionysus Heer, O., 1864^{c g}
- Rhynchites fulgidus (Geoffroy, E.L., 1785)^{c g}
- Rhynchites hageni Heyden, C. von & Heyden, L. von., 1866^{c g}
- Rhynchites orcinus Heyden, C. von & Heyden, L. von., 1866^{c g}
- Rhynchites rhedi (Schrank, F.P., 1781)^{c g}
- Rhynchites velatus LeConte, 1880^{i c b}
- Rhynchites viridiaeneus Randall, 1838^{i c}

Data sources: i = ITIS, c = Catalogue of Life, g = GBIF, b = Bugguide.net
