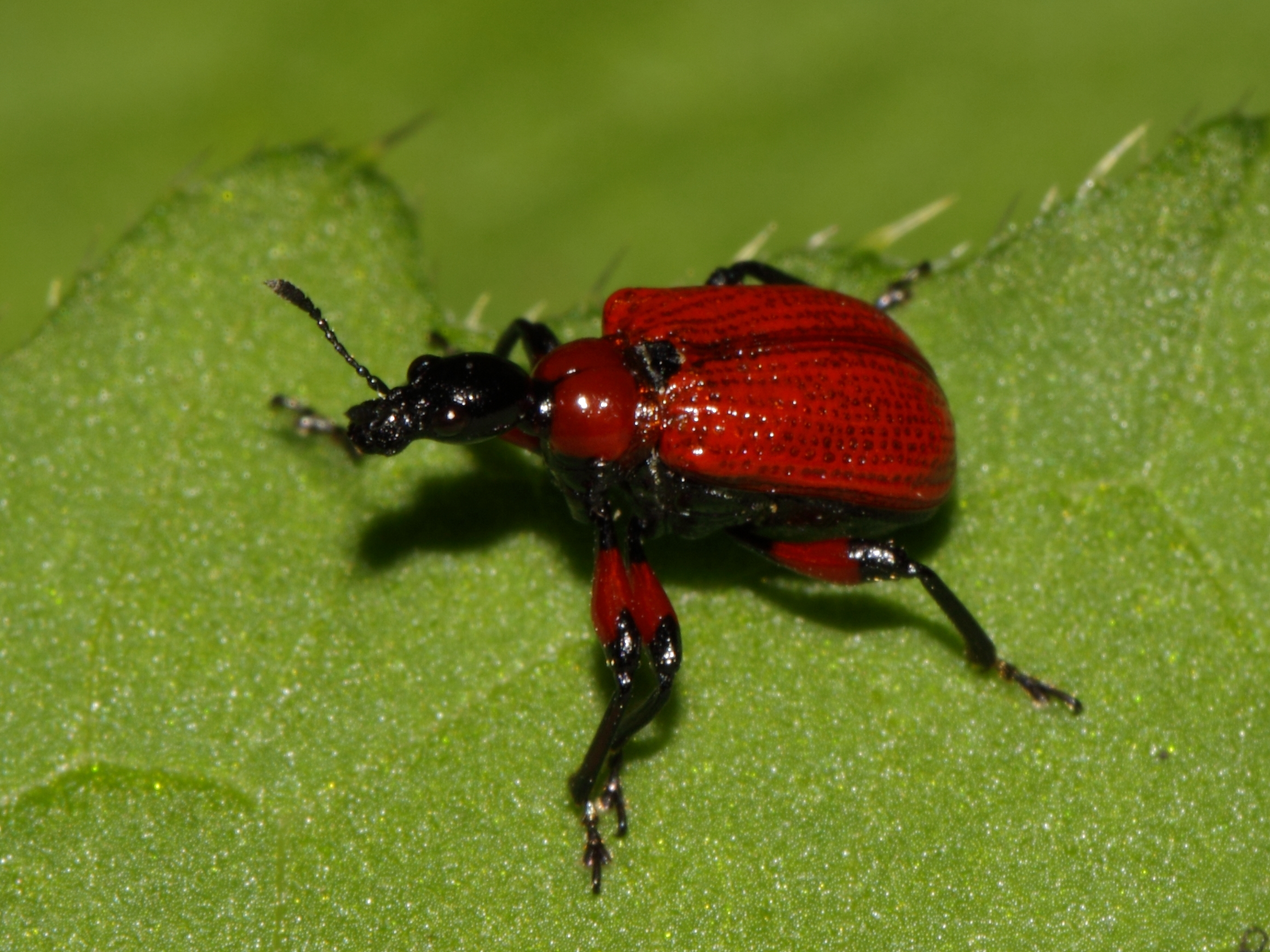
- Apoderus coryli, Slovakia

Scientific classification
- Kingdom: Animalia
- Phylum: Arthropoda
- Clade: Pancrustacea
- Class: Insecta
- Order: Coleoptera
- Suborder: Polyphaga
- Infraorder: Cucujiformia
- Superfamily: Curculionoidea
- Family: Attelabidae
- Subfamily: Apoderinae; Jekel, 1860

Tribes
- Apoderini Jekel, 1860; Clitostylini Voss, 1929; Hoplapoderini Voss, 1926; Trachelophorini Voss, 1926

= Apoderinae =

Subfamily of beetles

Apoderinae is a subfamily of leaf rolling weevils in the beetle family Attelabidae. There are at least 20 genera and more than 650 described species in Apoderinae, found in Europe, Asia, and Africa.

== Genera ==
These genera belong to the subfamily Apoderinae:

- Agomadaranus Voss, 1958
- Allapoderus Voss, 1927
- Apoderus Olivier 1807
- Centrocorynus Jekel, 1860
- Compsapoderus Voss, 1927
- Cycnotrachelodus
- Cycnotrachelus Jekel, 1860
- Hamiltonius Alonso-Zarazaga & Lyal, 1999
- Hoplapoderus Jekel, 1860
- Korotyaevirhinus Legalov, 2003
- Leptapoderus Jekel, 1860
- Paracycnotrachelus Voss, 1924
- Paratrachelophorus Voss, 1924
- Paroplapoderus Voss, 1926
- Phymatapoderus Voss, 1926
- Pseudallapoderus Legalov, 2003
- Pseudotrachelophorus Legalov, 2007
- Strigapoderopsis
- Strigapoderus Jekel, 1860
- Tomapoderus Voss, 1926
- Trachelophorus Jekel, 1860
