= Eduard Voss =

German entomologist (1884–1974)

- Born: 3 July 1884
- Died: 2 November 1974 (aged 90)
- Occupation: Scientific collector
- Academic career

Eduard Voss (1884 - 1974) was a German entomologist, who specialized in beetles (Coleoptera), in particular the weevil family (Curculionidae). He described many new species and a number of beetles are named after him. Much of his beetle collection was lost in World War II, but some of the remaining collection is held in the Zoologischs Museum Hamburg.

== Some taxa named by him ==
- Apion subdiscedens
- Euops tibialis
- Euops viridiceps
- Pseudomesitodes

== Selected publications ==
- Voss, E. 1922. Indo-Malayische Rhynchitinen (Curculionidae). I. Philippine journal of science 21(4), 385–415.
- Voss, E. 1922. Neue Rüsselkäfer aus verschiedenen Erdteilen. Deutsche entomologische Zeitschrift 1922: 166–174 ISSN 0012-0073.
- Voss, E. 1922. Kurze Bemerkungen über Rüsselkäfer. Deutsche entomologische Zeitschrift 1922: 174 ISSN 0012-0073.
- Voss, E. 1922. Sauter's Formosa-Ausbeute: Curculionidae: Rhynchitinae (Col.). (4. Beitrag zur Kenntnis der Curculioniden.). Archiv für Naturgeschichte 87 (A) (11) [1921]: 277–286.
- Eduard Voss (1935). "Monographie der Rhynchitinen-Tribus Äulefini. III. Teil der Monographie der Rhynchitinae- Ptercolinae. (37. Beitrag zur Kenntnis der Curculioniden.)" (PDF). Stettiner Entomologische Zeitung (in German). 96: 229–241. ISSN 2944-733X. Wikidata Q107078152. Archived from the original (PDF) on 2 June 2021.
- Eduard Voss (1963). "Ergebnisse der Zoologischen Nubien-Expedition 1962: Teil XXII, Coleoptera: Curculionidae". Annalen des Naturhistorischen Museums in Wien (in German). 67: 583–601. ISSN 0083-6133. JSTOR 41769247. Wikidata Q100974618.
- Voss, E. 1970: Attelabidae, Curculionidae. (Ergebnisse des Forschungsunternehmens Nepal Himalaya). Nachtrag. Khumbu Himal, 3(3): 444–456.
- Voss, E. (1971) Beschreibung von vier Cossoninen, nebst je einer Gattung und Untergattung (Col., Curc.). (Beitrag 209 zur Kenntnis der Curculioniden). Entomologische Mitteilungen aus dem Zoologischen Museum Hamburg, 4(74), 195–200.
- Voss, E (1974) Coleoptera: Curculionidae partim. South African Animal Life, 15: 395–479.
