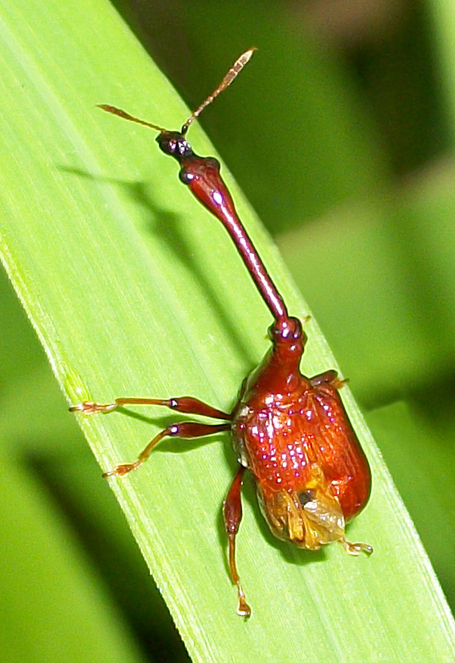
- Cycnotrachelus longicollis in India

Scientific classification
- Kingdom: Animalia
- Phylum: Arthropoda
- Clade: Pancrustacea
- Class: Insecta
- Order: Coleoptera
- Suborder: Polyphaga
- Infraorder: Cucujiformia
- Clade: Phytophaga
- Superfamily: Curculionoidea
- Family: Attelabidae; Billberg, 1820

Subfamilies
- Apoderinae; Attelabinae - leaf-rolling weevils Euscelinae; Hybolabinae; Pilolabinae; Pterocolinae; Rhynchitinae but see text

= Attelabidae =

Family of beetles

The Attelabidae is a widespread family of weevils. They are among the primitive weevils, because of their straight antennae, which are inserted near the base of the rostrum. The prothorax is much narrower than the base of the elytra on the abdomen. Attelabidae and the related family Rhynchitidae are known commonly as the leaf-rolling weevils. Rhynchitidae may be treated as subfamily Rhynchitinae of the Attelabidae.

Some members of this family have long necks and may be called giraffe weevils, particularly Trachelophorus giraffa. A few species are minor agricultural pests. The larvae of Rhynchitinae feed in flower buds, fruits, and terminal shoots, or are leaf miners. The subfamily Attelabinae are the true leaf rollers. The female cuts slits into leaves to deposit her eggs, and rolls that part of the leaf in which the larvae will feed.

== Taxonomy ==
=== Selected genera ===
- Apoderus
- Attelabus
- Cycnotrachelus
- Eleuscelus
- Euops
- Paralleuscelus
- Pareleuscelus
- Pheleuscelus
- Rhodocyrtus
- Rhynchites
- Sawadaeuops
- Suniops
- Trachelophorus

=== Tree ===
The phylogenetic position of the family within the Curculionoidea based on 18S ribosomal DNA and morphological data can be illustrated in a tree:

- - - Nemonychidae
    - Anthribidae
  - - Belidae
    - - Attelabidae
      - - Caridae
        - - Brentidae
          - Curculionidae
