= List of Eugnamptus species =

This is a list of 173 species in Eugnamptus, a genus of leaf and bud weevils in the family Attelabidae.

== Eugnamptus species ==
- Eugnamptus abdominalis Voss, 1941^{c}
- Eugnamptus adjectus Voss, 1937^{c}
- Eugnamptus affinis Voss, 1941^{c}
- Eugnamptus amurensis Faust, 1889^{c}
- Eugnamptus angustatus (Herbst, 1797)^{i c g b}
- Eugnamptus antennalis Sharp, 1889^{c}
- Eugnamptus apicalis Faust, 1892^{c}
- Eugnamptus apicipennis Voss, 1961^{c}
- Eugnamptus atratulus Voss, 1941^{c}
- Eugnamptus atriceps Voss, 1941^{c}
- Eugnamptus atripennis Voss, 1941^{c}
- Eugnamptus aurifrons Roelofs, 1874^{c}
- Eugnamptus bakeri Voss, 1941^{c}
- Eugnamptus balius Hamilton & Novinger^{g}
- Eugnamptus basalis Sharp, 1889^{c}
- Eugnamptus bellus Hamilton & Novinger^{g}
- Eugnamptus bicolor Legalov, 2003^{c}
- Eugnamptus bifenestratus Faust, 1892^{c}
- Eugnamptus bimaculosus Voss, 1939^{c}
- Eugnamptus bolivianus Voss, 1941^{c}
- Eugnamptus brevicollis Sharp, 1889^{c}
- Eugnamptus cervinus Voss, 1930^{c}
- Eugnamptus cinctus Sharp, 1889^{c b}
- Eugnamptus collaris Schoenh., 1839^{c}
- Eugnamptus congestus Voss, 1941^{c}
- Eugnamptus cornutus Sharp, 1889^{c}
- Eugnamptus decemsatus Scudder, S.H., 1878^{c g}
- Eugnamptus deporaoides Voss, 1941^{c}
- Eugnamptus diabroticus Sharp, 1889^{c}
- Eugnamptus dibaphus Voss, 1942^{c}
- Eugnamptus dimidiatus Voss, 1941^{c}
- Eugnamptus dispar Sharp, 1889^{c}
- Eugnamptus distinctus Kono, 1930^{c}
- Eugnamptus diversus Voss, 1949^{c}
- Eugnamptus divisus Sharp, 1889^{c}
- Eugnamptus dubius Voss, 1949^{c}
- Eugnamptus elongatus Voss, 1941^{c}
- Eugnamptus excisipes Voss, 1941^{c}
- Eugnamptus exiguum Voss,^{c}
- Eugnamptus flavicornis Voss, 1922^{c}
- Eugnamptus flavidus Faust, 1898^{c}
- Eugnamptus flavinasis Voss, 1941^{c}
- Eugnamptus flavinasus Boheman, 1845^{c}
- Eugnamptus flavipes Sharp, 1889^{c}
- Eugnamptus flavirostris Voss, 1941^{c}
- Eugnamptus fragilis Sharp, 1889^{c}
- Eugnamptus fukienensis Voss, 1942^{c}
- Eugnamptus furvus Marshall, 1948^{c}
- Eugnamptus fuscipes Pierce, 1913^{c}
- Eugnamptus germanus Sharp, 1890^{c}
- Eugnamptus giganteus Legalov, 2003^{c}
- Eugnamptus godmani Sharp, 1890^{c}
- Eugnamptus gracilicornis Dalla Torre & Voss, 1937^{c}
- Eugnamptus gracilipes Voss, 1941^{c}
- Eugnamptus gracilis Voss, 1941^{c}
- Eugnamptus grandaevus Voss, 1941^{c}
- Eugnamptus grandiceps Voss, 1957^{c}
- Eugnamptus grisescens Voss, 1945^{c}
- Eugnamptus grisesceus Voss,^{c}
- Eugnamptus herediensis Hamilton & Novinger^{g}
- Eugnamptus hirsutus Voss, 1924^{c}
- Eugnamptus hirtellus Sharp, 1889^{c}
- Eugnamptus inclusus Voss, 1939^{c}
- Eugnamptus instabilis Voss, 1941^{c}
- Eugnamptus insularis Dalla Torre & Voss, 1937^{c}
- Eugnamptus interruptus Voss, 1941^{c}
- Eugnamptus ixigerum Voss, 1941^{c}
- Eugnamptus kazantsevi Legalov, 2003^{c}
- Eugnamptus kuatunensis Voss, 1949^{c}
- Eugnamptus kubani Alonso-Zarazaga in Löbl & Smetana (eds.), 2011^{c}
- Eugnamptus lacunosus Voss, 1949^{c}
- Eugnamptus laticeps Voss, 1941^{c}
- Eugnamptus latifrons Sharp, 1889^{c}
- Eugnamptus latirostris Sharp, 1889^{c}
- Eugnamptus lituratus Voss, 1941^{c}
- Eugnamptus longicollis Voss, 1941^{c}
- Eugnamptus longipes Sharp, 1889^{c}
- Eugnamptus longiusculus Hamilton & Novinger^{g}
- Eugnamptus longulus Sharp, 1889^{c}
- Eugnamptus maculatus Sharp, 1889^{c}
- Eugnamptus maculifer Voss, 1945^{c}
- Eugnamptus manshinsis Legalov, 2003^{c}
- Eugnamptus marginatus Pasc., 1883^{c}
- Eugnamptus marginellus Faust, 1898^{c}
- Eugnamptus medvedevi Legalov, 2003^{c}
- Eugnamptus minuta Voss, 1945^{c}
- Eugnamptus mirabilis Legalov, 2003^{c}
- Eugnamptus monchadskii Legalov, 2007^{c}
- Eugnamptus morimotoi Nakane, 1963^{c}
- Eugnamptus morio Voss, 1945^{c}
- Eugnamptus niger Sharp, 1889^{c}
- Eugnamptus nigriceps Voss, 1932^{c}
- Eugnamptus nigricornis Sharp, 1889^{c}
- Eugnamptus nigrinipennis Voss, 1941^{c}
- Eugnamptus nigrinipes Voss, 1945^{c}
- Eugnamptus nigrinus Dalla Torre & Voss, 1937^{c}
- Eugnamptus nigripennis Sharp, 1889^{c}
- Eugnamptus nigripes Melsh. & Pierce, 1913^{c}
- Eugnamptus nigriventris Schaeffer, 1905^{i c b}
- Eugnamptus nigrocapitus Legalov, 2007^{c}
- Eugnamptus nigropectoralis Voss, 1945^{c}
- Eugnamptus nigroruber Legalov, 2007^{c}
- Eugnamptus notatus Voss, 1941^{c}
- Eugnamptus nuda Voss, 1945^{c}
- Eugnamptus obscurus Sharp, 1889^{c}
- Eugnamptus palleolus Voss, 1939^{c}
- Eugnamptus pallidus Schaeffer, 1908^{i c b}
- Eugnamptus pannosus Marshall, 1948^{c}
- Eugnamptus pardalis Marshall, 1948^{c}
- Eugnamptus parvulus Voss, 1941^{c}
- Eugnamptus pedestris Voss, 1949^{c}
- Eugnamptus piceus Voss, 1941^{c}
- Eugnamptus picticollis Sharp, 1890^{c}
- Eugnamptus pilosellus Voss, 1941^{c}
- Eugnamptus plebeius Sharp, 1890^{c}
- Eugnamptus pseudonigriventris Hamilton, 1990^{i g}
- Eugnamptus punctatus Pierce, 1913^{i c b}
- Eugnamptus puncticeps LeConte, 1876^{i c b}
- Eugnamptus punctiger Voss, 1941^{c}
- Eugnamptus pusillus Hamilton & Novinger^{g}
- Eugnamptus quadrimaculatus Voss, 1945^{c}
- Eugnamptus rostralis Hamilton & Novinger^{g}
- Eugnamptus ruber Legalov, 2003^{c}
- Eugnamptus rubricollis Dalla Torre & Voss, 1937^{c}
- Eugnamptus rudis Legalov, 2007^{c}
- Eugnamptus ruficeps Pierce, 1913^{c}
- Eugnamptus ruficollis Dalla Torre & Voss, 1937^{c}
- Eugnamptus rufifrons Sharp, 1889^{c}
- Eugnamptus rufipennis Marshall, 1948^{c}
- Eugnamptus rusticus Legalov, 2003^{c}
- Eugnamptus salvini Sharp, 1889^{c}
- Eugnamptus sanguinolentus Voss, 1939^{c}
- Eugnamptus sarapiquensis Hamilton & Novinger^{g}
- Eugnamptus sauteri Voss, 1921^{c}
- Eugnamptus semipurpurea Voss, 1941^{c}
- Eugnamptus semivittatus Sharp, 1889^{c}
- Eugnamptus seriatus Sharp, 1889^{c}
- Eugnamptus sexmaculatus Sharp, 1889^{c}
- Eugnamptus sexpunctatus Voss, 1945^{c}
- Eugnamptus sheilae Hamilton, 1990^{i g}
- Eugnamptus sitshuanensis Legalov, 2003^{c}
- Eugnamptus striatus LeConte, 1876^{i c}
- Eugnamptus subcarinulatus Voss, 1945^{c}
- Eugnamptus subcoeruleifrons Voss, 1939^{c}
- Eugnamptus subcuprea Voss, 1945^{c}
- Eugnamptus subpurpureus Voss, 1941^{c}
- Eugnamptus sulcatus Voss, 1941^{c}
- Eugnamptus sulcicollis Hamilton & Novinger^{g}
- Eugnamptus sulcifrons Gyllenhal, 1839^{c}
- Eugnamptus sumatranensis Legalov, 2007^{c}
- Eugnamptus suturalis Sharp, 1889^{c}
- Eugnamptus tahorinensis Voss, 1922^{c}
- Eugnamptus taihorinensis Voss, 1941^{c}
- Eugnamptus tenuicollis Pascoe, 1885^{c}
- Eugnamptus tessellatus Voss, 1941^{c}
- Eugnamptus testaceipennis Voss, 1941^{c}
- Eugnamptus testaceus Pierce, 1910^{c}
- Eugnamptus tibialis Sharp, 1889^{c}
- Eugnamptus trinotatus Voss, 1941^{c}
- Eugnamptus tropicus Kirsch, 1874^{c}
- Eugnamptus truncatus Sharp, 1889^{c}
- Eugnamptus tucumanensis Voss, 1957^{c}
- Eugnamptus validus Sharp, 1889^{c}
- Eugnamptus variabilis Voss, 1945^{c}
- Eugnamptus varicolor Voss, 1941^{c}
- Eugnamptus varius Sharp, 1889^{c}
- Eugnamptus vicinus Voss, 1941^{c}
- Eugnamptus vietnamensis Legalov, 2003^{c}
- Eugnamptus violaceiceps Voss, 1939^{c}
- Eugnamptus viridiana Voss, 1941^{c}
- Eugnamptus viridirostris Voss, 1924^{c}
- Eugnamptus yunnanensis Voss, 1941^{c}
- Eugnamptus zhejiangensis Legalov, 2003^{c}

Data sources: i = ITIS, c = Catalogue of Life, g = GBIF, b = Bugguide.net
