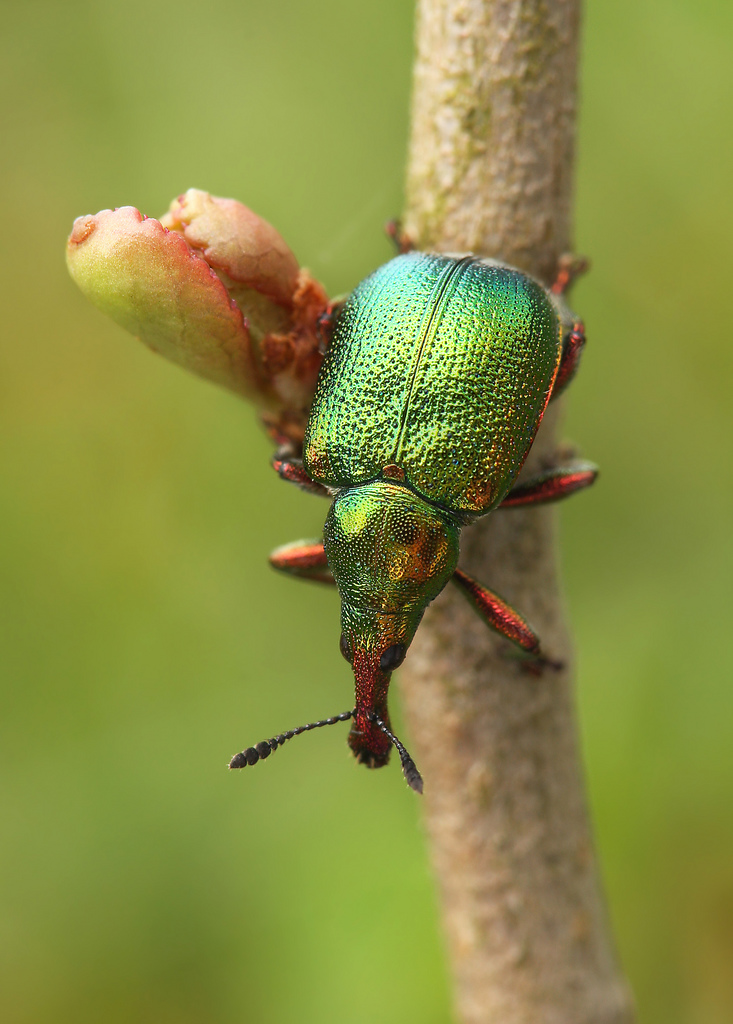
- Byctiscus betulae

Scientific classification
- Kingdom: Animalia
- Phylum: Arthropoda
- Clade: Pancrustacea
- Class: Insecta
- Order: Coleoptera
- Suborder: Polyphaga
- Infraorder: Cucujiformia
- Family: Attelabidae
- Subfamily: Rhynchitinae; Gistel, 1856

= Rhynchitinae =

Family of beetles

Byctiscus populi in copula and leaf-rolling

Rhynchitinae, the tooth-nosed snout weevils, are small beetles (1.5 to 6.5 mm) that are usually found in vegetation. They usually use buds, fruits, or seeds for oviposition. The tooth-nosed snout weevils receive this name due to the teeth on the edges of their mandibles.

Traditionally considered a subfamily of Attelabidae within the Curculionoidea (weevils and relatives), the tooth-nosed snout weevils are regarded as a separate family Rhynchitidae by some authorities.

A common member of this group is the rose curculio, Merhynchites bicolor, which feeds on roses.

A number of species from Rhynchitinae are recorded from Britain.

The thief weevil, Pterocolus ovatus, is the only pterocoline (subfamily Pterocolinae) known from North America. It is an obligate egg predator and nidus kleptoparasite (nest thief) of some beetles in the family Attelabidae.

== Genera ==
These genera belong to the subfamily Rhynchitinae:

- Acritorrhynchites Voss, 1941
- Aderorhinus Sharp, 1889
- Afrorhynchites Legalov, 2003
- Aspidobyctiscus Schilsky, 1903
- Auletobius Desbrochers, 1869
- Byctiscus Thomson, 1859
- Caenorhinus Thomson, 1859
- Chonostropheus Prell, 1924
- Cyaneugnamptus Legalov, 2003
- Cyllorhynchites Voss, 2013
- Deporaus Samouelle, 1819
- Eomesauletes Legalov, 2001
- Essodius Sharp, 1889
- Eugnamptus Schönherr, 1839
- Eugnamptobius Voss, 1922
- Haplorhynchites Voss, 1924
- Hemilypus Sharp, 1889
- Involvulus Schrank, 1798
- Lasiorhynchites Jekel, 1860
- Mecorhis Billberg, 1820
- Merhynchites Sharp, 1889
- Metopum
- Minurus Waterhouse, 1842
- Neocoenorhinidius Legalov, 2003
- Neocoenorrhinus Voss, 1952
- Neoeugnamptus Legalov, 2003
- Pseudauletes Voss, 1922
- Rhodocyrtus Alonso-Zarazaga & Lyal, 1999
- Rhynchites Schneider, 1791
- Schoenitemnus Legalov, 2003
- Tatianaerhynchites Legalov 2002
- Temnocerus Thunberg, 1815
- Teretriorhynchites Voss, 1938
- † Stenorhynchites Havlicek 1990
