= List of Auletobius species =

This is a list of 223 species in the genus Auletobius.

== Auletobius species ==
- Auletobius acaciae Voss, 1935
- Auletobius adscendens Heller, 1915
- Auletobius aenescens Schilsky in Kuster, 1903
- Auletobius affinis Sharp, 1890
- Auletobius akinini Voss, 1922
- Auletobius albopilosus Voss, 1922
- Auletobius albovestita Voss, 1922
- Auletobius anceps Voss, 1922
- Auletobius ankaratraensis Hustache, 1956
- Auletobius aopensis Legalov, 2007
- Auletobius arunachalensis Legalov, 2007
- Auletobius ascendens Heller, 1916
- Auletobius ater (LeConte, 1876)
- Auletobius aterrimus Voss, 1933
- Auletobius aurichalceus Voss, 1939
- Auletobius bakeri Voss, 1922
- Auletobius basilaris Dalla Torre & Voss, 1937
- Auletobius beckeri Voss, 1933
- Auletobius bengalensis Legalov, 2003
- Auletobius berberidis Voss, 1933
- Auletobius bicolor Voss, 1922
- Auletobius blatchleyi Voss, 1935
- Auletobius blawanus Voss, 1940
- Auletobius brevihirtus Voss, 1939
- Auletobius brevirostris Voss, 1922
- Auletobius brunneus Voss, 1935
- Auletobius bryophagus Dalla Torre & Voss, 1937
- Auletobius calceatus Pascoe, 1922
- Auletobius callonus Voss,
- Auletobius callosus Voss, 1922
- Auletobius calvus Voss,
- Auletobius capensis Voss, 1933
- Auletobius cariniceps Dalla Torre & Voss, 1937
- Auletobius cassandrae (LeConte, 1876)
- Auletobius castaneus Voss, 1930
- Auletobius ceylonicus Voss, 1922
- Auletobius chiangensis Legalov, 2007
- Auletobius chinensis Voss, 1933
- Auletobius cisticola Fairm., 1859
- Auletobius cognatus Voss, 1930
- Auletobius collaris Voss, 1933
- Auletobius columbiensis Voss, 1922
- Auletobius combreti Voss, 1933
- Auletobius concolor Desbr., 1869
- Auletobius conformis Voss, 1922
- Auletobius congruus (Walker, 1866)
- Auletobius consimilis Voss, 1930
- Auletobius constrictus Schilsky in Kuster, 1903
- Auletobius contristanus Voss, 1939
- Auletobius contristatus Voss, 1939
- Auletobius convexifrons Voss, 1922
- Auletobius costulatus Voss, 1922
- Auletobius cremeri Voss, 1922
- Auletobius cubanus Voss, 1922
- Auletobius cylindricollis Voss, 1922
- Auletobius dapitanus Voss, 1922
- Auletobius densatus Voss, 1933
- Auletobius discedens Voss, 1956
- Auletobius discimacula Vitale, 1937
- Auletobius dispar Voss, 1935
- Auletobius diversicolor Voss, 1939
- Auletobius ebenus Hustache, 1956
- Auletobius emeishanicus Legalov, 2007
- Auletobius emgei Stierl., 1888
- Auletobius erythroderes Dalla Torre & Voss, 1937
- Auletobius eucalypti Voss, 1933
- Auletobius euphorbiae Voss, 1933
- Auletobius fangensis Legalov, 2007
- Auletobius fausti Voss, 1922
- Auletobius filirostris Voss, 1922
- Auletobius flavimaculatus Voss, 1922
- Auletobius flavomaculatus Voss, 1922
- Auletobius flavus Legalov, 2007
- Auletobius fochaensis Legalov, 2003
- Auletobius formosanus Voss, 1922
- Auletobius formosus Voss, 1933
- Auletobius freyi Uyttenboogaart, 1940
- Auletobius fukienensis Voss, 1941
- Auletobius fuliginosus Voss, 1935
- Auletobius fulvescens Voss, 1936
- Auletobius fumigatus Voss, 1922
- Auletobius fuscofasciatus Voss, 1933
- Auletobius gamoensis Marshall, 1954
- Auletobius gestroi Voss, 1922
- Auletobius ghumensis Legalov, 2007
- Auletobius gibbipennis Hustache, 1956
- Auletobius glaber Faust, 1892
- Auletobius guadelupensis Hustache, 1930
- Auletobius hanashanensis Legalov, 2007
- Auletobius helleri Voss, 1922
- Auletobius hirtellus Voss, 1941
- Auletobius hirtus Voss, 1933
- Auletobius hortulanus Voss, 1935
- Auletobius humboldti Voss, 1933
- Auletobius humeralis (Boheman, 1859)
- Auletobius hunanicus Legalov, 2007
- Auletobius hustachei Dalla Torre & Voss, 1937
- Auletobius ilicis Géné, 1839
- Auletobius imitator Voss, 1933
- Auletobius impectitus Voss, 1935
- Auletobius inconstans Voss, 1933
- Auletobius insularis Lea, 1926
- Auletobius ipohensis Legalov, 2007
- Auletobius irkutensis Faust, 1893
- Auletobius japonicus Voss, 1922
- Auletobius kalimantanensis Legalov, 2007
- Auletobius karnatakaensis Legalov, 2003
- Auletobius kaszabi Ter-Minasian, 1971
- Auletobius kenyensis Legalov, 2007
- Auletobius klapperichi Voss, 1941
- Auletobius kraatzi Voss, 1922
- Auletobius kuntzeni Voss, 1922
- Auletobius kuscheli Voss, 1957
- Auletobius laterirostris Dalla Torre & Voss, 1937
- Auletobius laticollis (Casey, 1888)
- Auletobius longicollis Faust, 1898
- Auletobius longirostris Legalov, 2007
- Auletobius lumlensis Legalov, 2003
- Auletobius maculatus Voss, 1933
- Auletobius maculipennis Schilsky in Kuster, 1903
- Auletobius maderensis Desbr., 1869
- Auletobius major Voss, 1922
- Auletobius mandibularis Voss, 1922
- Auletobius mariposae (Zimmerman, 1932)
- Auletobius maroccanus Hoffmann, 1953
- Auletobius medvedevi Legalov, 2003
- Auletobius melaleuca Voss, 1933
- Auletobius melanocephalus Voss, 1934
- Auletobius mengalensis Legalov, 2007
- Auletobius meridionalis Dalla Torre & Voss, 1937
- Auletobius minor Dalla Torre & Voss, 1937
- Auletobius montanus Voss, 1922
- Auletobius montrouzieri Voss, 1942
- Auletobius nasalis (LeConte, 1876)
- Auletobius nepalensis Voss, 1974
- Auletobius nigrinus Voss, 1920
- Auletobius nigritarsis Voss, 1933
- Auletobius nigrocyaneus Dalla Torre & Voss, 1937
- Auletobius nitens Kono, 1930
- Auletobius nitidus Voss, 1922
- Auletobius nudus Sharp, 1890
- Auletobius nuristanensis Voss, 1959
- Auletobius obscurethoracalis Legalov, 2007
- Auletobius obtatus Sharp, 1890
- Auletobius orientalis Hustache, 1929
- Auletobius ovatus Voss, 1922
- Auletobius pahangensis Legalov, 2007
- Auletobius pallidus Voss, 1933
- Auletobius pallipes Voss, 1933
- Auletobius perturbatus Voss, 1930
- Auletobius picticornis Voss, 1922
- Auletobius podocarpi Voss, 1933
- Auletobius politus Voss, 1934
- Auletobius procerus Voss, 1922
- Auletobius pruinosus Voss, 1933
- Auletobius puberulus Voss, 1922
- Auletobius pubescens Schilsky in Kuster, 1903
- Auletobius pumilio Marshall, 1954
- Auletobius puncticollis Lea, 1933
- Auletobius punctiger Voss, 1922
- Auletobius punctipennis Dalla Torre & Voss, 1937
- Auletobius pygmaeus Hustache, 1956
- Auletobius rectirostris Voss, 1922
- Auletobius reichei Desbr., 1869
- Auletobius rhodesiensis Voss, 1933
- Auletobius rhynchitoides Dalla Torre & Voss, 1952
- Auletobius rostralis Sharp, 1890
- Auletobius rostraloides Legalov, 2003
- Auletobius ruber Legalov, 2007
- Auletobius rubrorufus Voss, 1922
- Auletobius rufipennis (Pierce, 1909)
- Auletobius rufus Legalov, 2007
- Auletobius sandakanensis Legalov, 2007
- Auletobius sanguineus Voss, 1920
- Auletobius sanguisorbae Kono, 1935
- Auletobius shanpingensis Legalov, 2007
- Auletobius simillimus Voss, 1933
- Auletobius singaporensis Legalov, 2007
- Auletobius striatopunctatus Dalla Torre & Voss, 1937
- Auletobius subbasalis Voss, 1933
- Auletobius subbasaloides Legalov, 2007
- Auletobius subcoeruleus Dalla Torre & Voss, 1937
- Auletobius subcordaticollis Voss, 1935
- Auletobius subgranulatus Voss, 1933
- Auletobius submaculatus Voss, 1922
- Auletobius subocellatus Voss, 1942
- Auletobius subpicescens Voss, 1933
- Auletobius subplumbeus Chevr., 1860
- Auletobius subrufus Schilsky in Kuster, 1903
- Auletobius subseriepunctatus Voss, 1922
- Auletobius subsignatus Voss, 1922
- Auletobius subtuberculatus Voss, 1921
- Auletobius sumatranensis Legalov, 2007
- Auletobius suturalis Voss, 1922
- Auletobius tabaci Voss, 1922
- Auletobius taiwanensis Legalov, 2007
- Auletobius tanahensis Legalov, 2007
- Auletobius tenasserimensis Voss, 1933
- Auletobius tessoni Muls., 1868
- Auletobius testaceipennis Voss, 1934
- Auletobius testaceus Voss, 1934
- Auletobius thailandicus Legalov, 2003
- Auletobius tibialis Faust, 1892
- Auletobius togoensis Voss, 1922
- Auletobius toxopeusi Voss, 1957
- Auletobius transvaalensis Legalov, 2007
- Auletobius tuberculatus Voss, 1921
- Auletobius tucumanensis Hustache, 1926
- Auletobius turcestanensis Voss, 1933
- Auletobius turkestanensis Voss, 1933
- Auletobius turneri Voss, 1933
- Auletobius ueleanus Voss, 1939
- Auletobius ugandensis Legalov, 2007
- Auletobius ungurensis Legalov, 2007
- Auletobius uniformis Voss, 1922
- Auletobius urundiensis Voss, 1939
- Auletobius variipennis Voss, 1933
- Auletobius vietnamensis Legalov, 2003
- Auletobius viridimicans Voss, 1939
- Auletobius viridis (Pierce, 1909)
- Auletobius volkovitshi Legalov, 2003
- Auletobius vonmaltzani Voss, 1939
- Auletobius zumpti Voss, 1956
