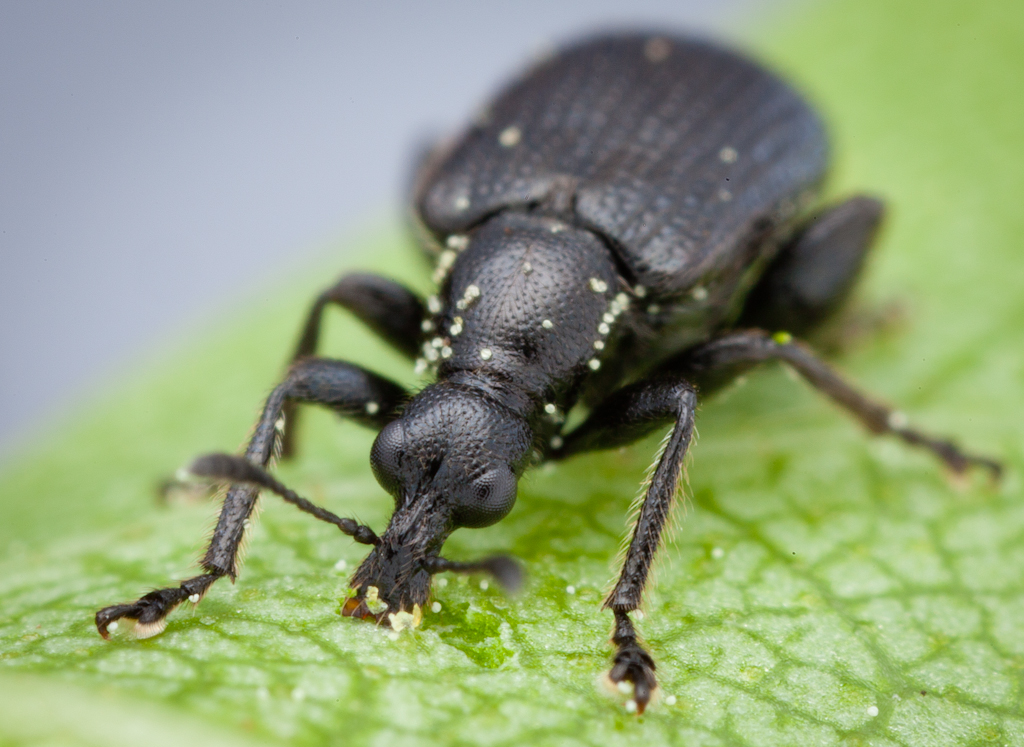

Scientific classification
- Kingdom: Animalia
- Phylum: Arthropoda
- Class: Insecta
- Order: Coleoptera
- Suborder: Polyphaga
- Infraorder: Cucujiformia
- Superfamily: Curculionoidea
- Family: Attelabidae
- Subfamily: Rhynchitinae
- Genus: Deporaus
- Species: D. betulae

Binomial name
- Deporaus betulae Linné, 1758

Synonyms
- Attelabus betulae L., 1758; Curculio fuliginosus Gmelin, 1790; Curculio nigrostriatus Goeze, 1777; Deporaus betulae Bedel, 1883; Deporaus betulae Henschel, 1895; Deporaus betulae Stephens, 1831; Deporaus populi Scopoli; Deporaus fagi Scopoli; Rhinomacer niger Geoffroy, 1785

= Deporaus betulae =

Species of beetle

Deporaus betulae is a species of European weevil that feeds on birches (Betula spp.). It belongs to the family Attelabidae and tribe Deporaini.

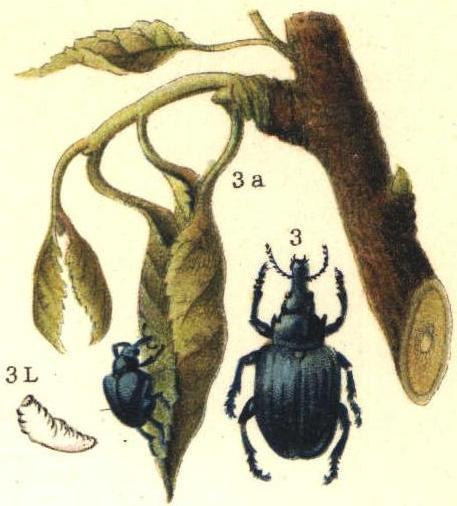
Life cycle
