= Involvulus hirtus =

Scientific classification
- Domain: Eukaryota
- Kingdom: Animalia
- Phylum: Arthropoda
- Class: Insecta
- Order: Coleoptera
- Suborder: Polyphaga
- Infraorder: Cucujiformia
- Family: Attelabidae
- Genus: Involvulus
- Species: I. hirtus

Binomial name
- Involvulus hirtus (Fabricius, 1801)

Species of beetle

Involvulus hirtus is a species of leaf rolling weevil in the beetle family Attelabidae.
