= Eugnamptus angustatus =

Scientific classification
- Kingdom: Animalia
- Phylum: Arthropoda
- Class: Insecta
- Order: Coleoptera
- Suborder: Polyphaga
- Infraorder: Cucujiformia
- Family: Attelabidae
- Genus: Eugnamptus
- Species: E. angustatus

Binomial name
- Eugnamptus angustatus (Herbst, 1797)

Species of beetle

Eugnamptus angustatus is a species of leaf rolling weevil in the beetle family Attelabidae. It is found in North America. Larvae are leaf miners of dead Sassafras albidum leaves.

== Subspecies ==
These two subspecies belong to the species Eugnamptus angustatus:

- Eugnamptus angustatus angustatus
- Eugnamptus angustatus testaceus Pierce
