= Auletobius nasalis =

Scientific classification
- Kingdom: Animalia
- Phylum: Arthropoda
- Class: Insecta
- Order: Coleoptera
- Suborder: Polyphaga
- Infraorder: Cucujiformia
- Family: Attelabidae
- Genus: Auletobius
- Species: A. nasalis

Binomial name
- Auletobius nasalis (LeConte, 1876)

Species of beetle

Auletobius nasalis is a species of leaf rolling weevil in the beetle family Attelabidae. It is found in North America.
