= Eugnamptus pallidus =

Scientific classification
- Domain: Eukaryota
- Kingdom: Animalia
- Phylum: Arthropoda
- Class: Insecta
- Order: Coleoptera
- Suborder: Polyphaga
- Infraorder: Cucujiformia
- Family: Attelabidae
- Genus: Eugnamptus
- Species: E. pallidus

Binomial name
- Eugnamptus pallidus Schaeffer, 1908

Species of beetle

Eugnamptus pallidus is a species of leaf rolling weevil in the beetle family Attelabidae.
