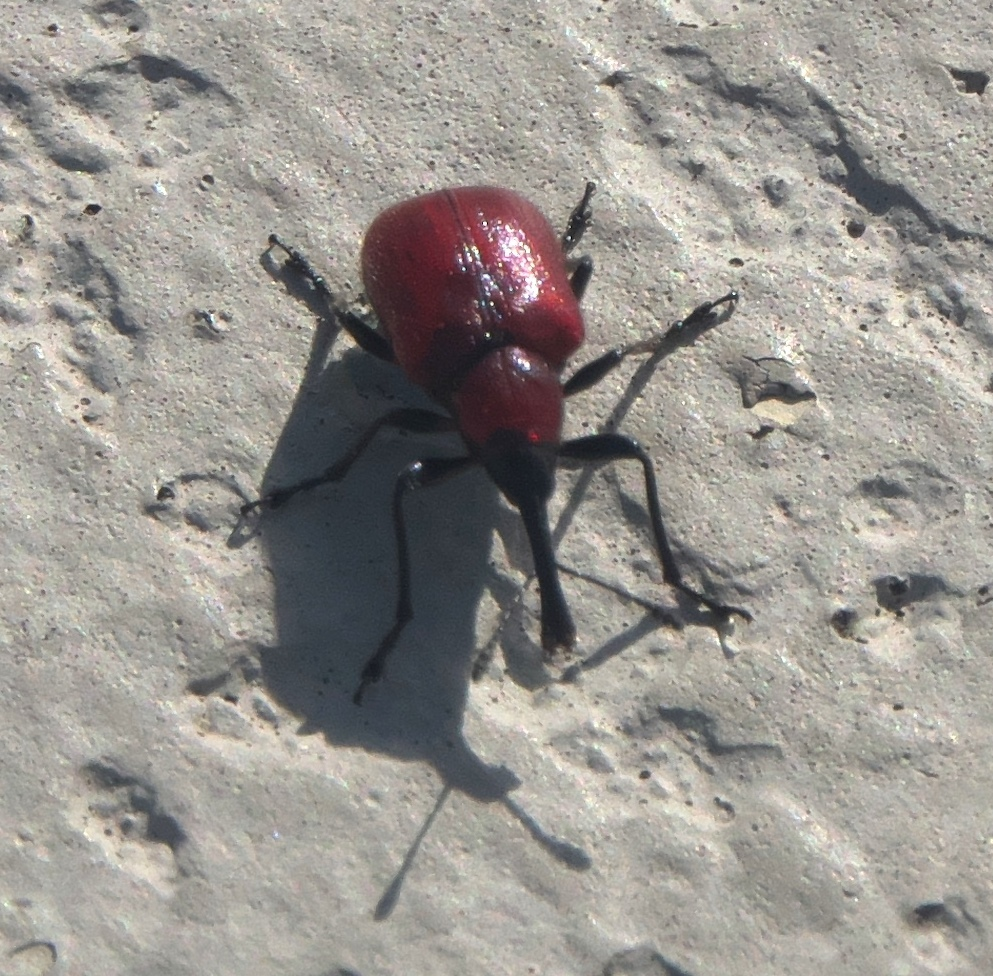
- Merhynchites wickhami, Oregon

Scientific classification
- Kingdom: Animalia
- Phylum: Arthropoda
- Class: Insecta
- Order: Coleoptera
- Suborder: Polyphaga
- Infraorder: Cucujiformia
- Family: Attelabidae
- Genus: Merhynchites
- Species: M. wickhami

Binomial name
- Merhynchites wickhami (Cockerell, 1912)

= Merhynchites wickhami =

Species of beetle

Merhynchites wickhami, the western rose curculio, is a species of leaf rolling weevil in the beetle family Attelabidae. It is found in North America.

== Subspecies ==
These two subspecies belong to the species Merhynchites wickhami:

- Merhynchites wickhami rufi Hamilton
- Merhynchites wickhami wickhami
