= Eugnamptus punctatus =

Scientific classification
- Domain: Eukaryota
- Kingdom: Animalia
- Phylum: Arthropoda
- Class: Insecta
- Order: Coleoptera
- Suborder: Polyphaga
- Infraorder: Cucujiformia
- Family: Attelabidae
- Genus: Eugnamptus
- Species: E. punctatus

Binomial name
- Eugnamptus punctatus Pierce, 1913

Species of beetle

Eugnamptus punctatus is a species of leaf rolling weevil in the beetle family Attelabidae. It is found in North America.

== Subspecies ==
These two subspecies belong to the species Eugnamptus punctatus:

- Eugnamptus punctatus niger Pierce
- Eugnamptus punctatus punctatus
