= Tatianaerhynchites =

Scientific classification
- Kingdom: Animalia
- Phylum: Arthropoda
- Clade: Pancrustacea
- Class: Insecta
- Order: Coleoptera
- Suborder: Polyphaga
- Infraorder: Cucujiformia
- Superfamily: Curculionoidea
- Family: Attelabidae
- Genus: Tatianaerhynchites; Legalov, 2002

Genus of insects

Tatianaerhynchites is a genus of beetles belonging to the family Rhynchitidae.

The species of this genus are found in Europe.

Species:

- Tatianaerhynchites aequatus (Linnaeus, 1767)
