= Deporaus glastinus =

Scientific classification
- Domain: Eukaryota
- Kingdom: Animalia
- Phylum: Arthropoda
- Class: Insecta
- Order: Coleoptera
- Suborder: Polyphaga
- Infraorder: Cucujiformia
- Family: Attelabidae
- Genus: Deporaus
- Species: D. glastinus

Binomial name
- Deporaus glastinus (LeConte, 1857)

Species of beetle

Deporaus glastinus is a species of leaf rolling weevil in the beetle family Attelabidae. It is found in North America.
