= Auletobius cassandrae =

Scientific classification
- Kingdom: Animalia
- Phylum: Arthropoda
- Class: Insecta
- Order: Coleoptera
- Suborder: Polyphaga
- Infraorder: Cucujiformia
- Family: Attelabidae
- Genus: Auletobius
- Species: A. cassandrae

Binomial name
- Auletobius cassandrae (LeConte, 1876)

Species of beetle

Auletobius cassandrae is a species of leaf rolling weevil in the beetle family Attelabidae. It is found in North America. It feeds on the leaves of the fern Comptonia peregrina.
