= Auletobius humeralis =

Scientific classification
- Kingdom: Animalia
- Phylum: Arthropoda
- Class: Insecta
- Order: Coleoptera
- Suborder: Polyphaga
- Infraorder: Cucujiformia
- Family: Attelabidae
- Genus: Auletobius
- Species: A. humeralis

Binomial name
- Auletobius humeralis (Boheman, 1859)

Species of beetle

Auletobius humeralis is a species of leaf or bud weevil in the family Attelabidae. It is found in North America.
