= Deporaus marginatus =

Scientific classification
- Domain: Eukaryota
- Kingdom: Animalia
- Phylum: Arthropoda
- Class: Insecta
- Order: Coleoptera
- Suborder: Polyphaga
- Infraorder: Cucujiformia
- Family: Attelabidae
- Genus: Deporaus
- Species: D. marginatus

Binomial name
- Deporaus marginatus Fst., 1894

Synonyms
- (Eugnamptus marginatus (Pascoe)

Species of beetle

Deporaus marginatus, commonly known as the mango leaf-cutting weevil, is a species of leaf weevil in the beetle family Attelabidae. It is a light tan colour with black elytra (wing cases), and is found in tropical Asia where it is a pest of mango (Mangifera indica).

== Distribution ==
The mango leaf-cutting weevil is native to tropical Asia where it occurs in Pakistan, India, Bangladesh, Myanmar, Thailand, Malaysia and Singapore.

== Hosts ==
In Thailand, this weevil has been found living on several different hosts including Mangifera indica, Mangifera caloneura, Mangifera boetida and Bouea burmanica. It can also be found on cashew (Anacardium occidentale), but the damage is seldom serious.

== Life cycle ==
The adult female uses her ovipositor to deposit eggs singly in small hollows excavated on the upper surface of a young leaf near the midrib; she then severs the leaf near the stalk from edge to edge, including the midrib, whereupon it falls to the ground. The eggs hatch in about two days, and the larvae mine into the leaf tissue. After a larval state lasting about eleven days, the larvae exit the leaf and form themselves earthen chambers in which to pupate. After undergoing metamorphosis, the adults emerge in about eight days. Six days later they are fully mature and start to breed, copulation usually taking place early in the morning, and lasting for about an hour. Female fecundity averages 614. The females live for about ten weeks and the males for about a week less.

== Damage ==
Adult weevils scrape the surface layers of mango leaves which turn brown, crumple and become contorted. They also cut "windowpanes" between the veins. The most obvious sign of infestation is the presence of cut leaves on the ground beneath the tree, and the stripped, leaf-less shoots, which can be seen from a distance. Infested trees have reduced growth rates, poor flowering and lower yields, the growth of root suckers may be slowed and grafts fail.
