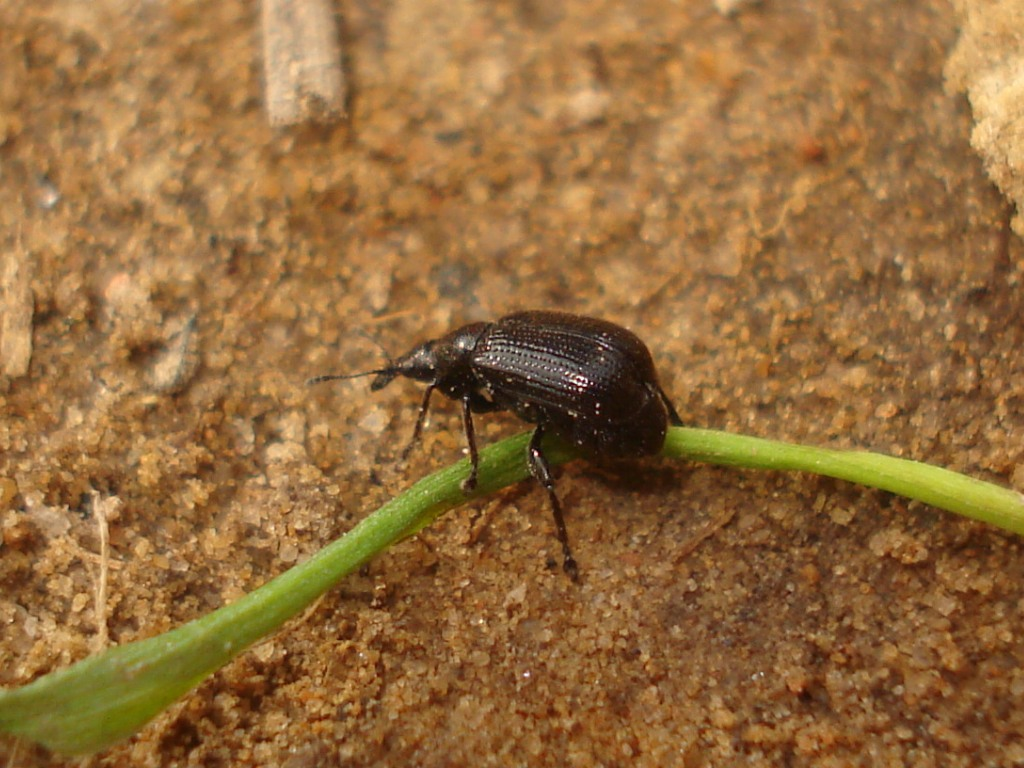
- Deporaus betulae

Scientific classification
- Domain: Eukaryota
- Kingdom: Animalia
- Phylum: Arthropoda
- Class: Insecta
- Order: Coleoptera
- Suborder: Polyphaga
- Infraorder: Cucujiformia
- Family: Attelabidae
- Subfamily: Rhynchitinae
- Genus: Deporaus; Samouelle, 1819

Synonyms
- Deporaus Leach, 1819

= Deporaus =

Genus of beetles

Deporaus is a genus of leaf and bud weevils in the beetle family Attelabidae. There are more than 200 described species in Deporaus.

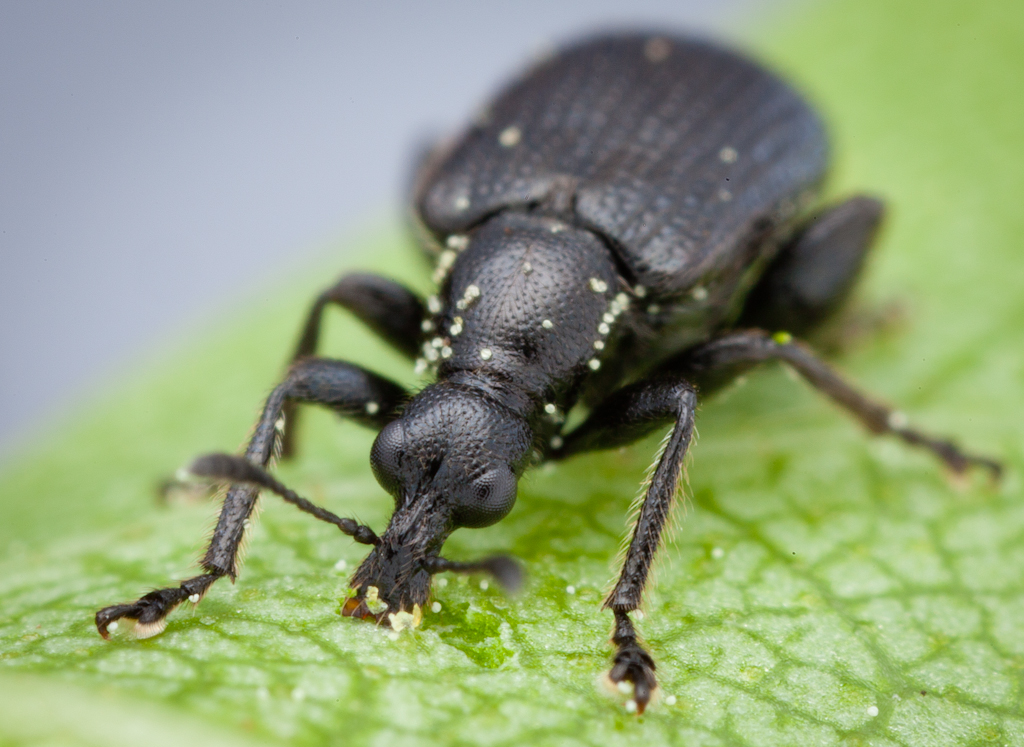
Deporaus betulae

== Species ==
The Global Biodiversity Information Facility lists:

- Deporaus aeneipennis Voss, 1938
- Deporaus affectatus Faust, 1887
  - D. affectatus Desbr., 1908, D. affectatus Voss, 1942
- Deporaus affinis Voss, 1922
- Deporaus alliariae Stephens, 1831
- Deporaus amplicollis Voss, 1942
- Deporaus amurensis Faust, 1887
- Deporaus angusticollis Voss, 1940
- Deporaus angustifrons Voss, 1938
- Deporaus apicalis Voss, 1922
- Deporaus arcuaticollis Voss, 1938
- Deporaus asiaticus Voss, 1974
- Deporaus assamensis Voss, 1938
- Deporaus aterrimiceps Voss, 1938
- Deporaus atricornis Voss, 1937
- Deporaus atripennis Voss, 1937
- Deporaus atroptera Voss, 1938
- Deporaus atrorufus Voss, 1942
- Deporaus basalis Voss, 1922
- Deporaus basilanensis Voss, 1922
- Deporaus betulae Linné, 1758
  - Synonyms: D. fagi, D. populi Dalla Torre & Voss, 1937
- Deporaus bicolor Voss, 1942
- Deporaus boettcheri Voss, 1938
- Deporaus brastagiensis Voss, 1938
- Deporaus brunneoclavus Legalov, 2007
- Deporaus cangshauensis Legalov, 2007
- Deporaus ceylonensis Voss, 1938
- Deporaus cinctus Voss, 1938
- Deporaus coerulescens Voss, 1938
- Deporaus confinis Voss, 1938
- Deporaus congestus Voss, 1938
- Deporaus conicirostris Voss, 1922
- Deporaus constrictus Gyll.In Schonherr, 1839
- Deporaus contiguus Voss, 1938
- Deporaus corporaali Voss, 1924
- Deporaus curtirostris Voss, 1922
- Deporaus cyaneopennis Shoenh., 1839
- Deporaus daliensis Alonso-Zarazaga
- Deporaus decoomani Voss, 1938
- Deporaus depressirostris Voss, 1938
- Deporaus depressus Faust, 1887
- Deporaus dimidiatus Heller, 1922
- Deporaus discretus Voss, 1922
- Deporaus disjunctus Voss, 1938
- Deporaus distinctus Voss, 1922
- Deporaus diversus Voss, 1938
- Deporaus dohertyi Voss, 1938
- Deporaus dohrni Voss, 1938
- Deporaus excoriato-niger Dalla Torre & Voss, 1937
- Deporaus exophthalmus Heller, 1921
- Deporaus femoralis Dalla Torre & Voss, 1937
  - D. femoralis Legalov, 2003
- Deporaus femorata Voss, 1942
- Deporaus flaviclavus Legalov, 2007
- Deporaus flavidorsis Nakane, 1963
- Deporaus flavidus Voss, 1938
- Deporaus flavipes Dalla Torre & Voss, 1937
- Deporaus flaviventris Voss, 1924
- Deporaus frater Voss, 1938
- Deporaus fukienensis Voss, 1941
- Deporaus fuliginosus Voss, 1924
- Deporaus fuscipennis Sharp, 1889
- Deporaus fusculus Voss, 1922
- Deporaus galerucoides Heller, 1922
- Deporaus gaolingensis Alonso-Zarazaga
- Deporaus gelastinus Faust, 1887
  - D. gelastinus Voss, 1938
- Deporaus gibbus Voss, 1938
- Deporaus giliventris Voss, 1938
- Deporaus gilviventris Voss, 1938
- Deporaus glabricollis Voss, 1938
- Deporaus glastinus O'Brien & Wibmer, 1982
- Deporaus gunlaishanensis Legalov, 2007
- Deporaus hartmanni Voss, 1929
- Deporaus hingensis Legalov, 2007
- Deporaus iliganensis Voss, 1922
- Deporaus impresipennis Voss, 1922
- Deporaus incertus Voss, 1958
- Deporaus inclinatus Voss, 1938
- Deporaus indicus Voss, 1941
- Deporaus inflatus Voss, 1938
- Deporaus javanicus Voss, 1935
- Deporaus jiriensis Alonso-Zarazaga
- Deporaus kalshoveni Voss, 1935
- Deporaus kangdingensis Legalov, 2007
- Deporaus kathmanduensis Alonso-Zarazaga
- Deporaus klapperichi Voss, 1941
- Deporaus kolbei Voss, 1938
- Deporaus laevicollis Stephens, 1831
- Deporaus laminatus Voss, 1938
- Deporaus lepidus Voss, 1938
- Deporaus lewisi Legalov, 2007
- Deporaus lizipingensis Legalov, 2007
- Deporaus longiceps Voss, 1922
- Deporaus luchti Voss, 1942
- Deporaus luctuosus Voss, 1942
- Deporaus maculiger Voss, 1922
- Deporaus major Voss, 1932
- Deporaus malabarensis Voss, 1957
- Deporaus mannerheimi Bedel, 1886
  - D. mannerheimi Voss, 1938
- Deporaus marginatus Fst., 1894
- Deporaus marginellus Voss, 1938
- Deporaus megacephalus Faust, 1887
  - D. megacephalus Seidlitz, 1891
- Deporaus merangicus Voss, 1938
- Deporaus minimus Kôno, 1928
- Deporaus minor Voss, 1939
- Deporaus minuroides Alonso-Zarazaga
- Deporaus montanus Voss, 1935
- Deporaus monticola Voss, 1922
- Deporaus mugezoensis Legalov, 2007
- Deporaus mysolensis Voss, 1942
- Deporaus nanlingensis Legalov, 2007
- Deporaus nepalensis Alonso-Zarazaga
- Deporaus niger Voss, 1938
- Deporaus nigriceps Voss, 1922
- Deporaus nigricornis Heller, 1922
- Deporaus nigrifrons Heller, 1922
- Deporaus nigrilineatus Voss, 1922
- Deporaus nigriniceps Voss, 1938
- Deporaus nigripennis Voss, 1937
- Deporaus nigritibialis Voss, 1922
- Deporaus nigriventris Voss, 1922
- Deporaus nigrolineatus Voss, 1922
- Deporaus notatus Voss, 1938
- Deporaus ohdaisanus Nakane, 1963
- Deporaus pacatus Faust, 1887
- Deporaus pacatus Legalov, 2003
- Deporaus pacatus Schilsky, 1903
- Deporaus palawana Voss, 1922
- Deporaus pallidiventris Voss, 1938
- Deporaus pallidulus Dalla Torre & Voss, 1937
- Deporaus papei Voss, 1935
- Deporaus parvicollis Voss, 1942
- Deporaus pauculus Voss, 1941
- Deporaus penangensis Voss, 1922
- Deporaus perakensis Voss, 1938
- Deporaus periscelis Voss, 1922
- Deporaus pilifer Voss, 1922
- Deporaus pilipes Voss, 1938
- Deporaus planipennis Roelofs, 1874
  - D. planipennis Sharp, 1889
- Deporaus podager Dalla Torre & Voss, 1937
- Deporaus populneus Dalla Torre & Voss
- Deporaus proximus Voss, 1938
- Deporaus pseudopacatus Legalov, 2007
- Deporaus puberulus Faust, 1894
  - D. puberulus Voss, 1942
- Deporaus pullatus Voss, 1922
- Deporaus punctatissimus Reitter, 1899
- Deporaus pygidialis Voss, 1938
- Deporaus reitteri Voss, 1935
- Deporaus robertsi Voss, 1941
- Deporaus rufipallens Voss, 1942
- Deporaus rufiventris Voss, 1922
- Deporaus rugiceps Voss, 1922
- Deporaus rugicollis Voss, 1922
- Deporaus rugulosus Voss, 1938
- Deporaus sagittatum Voss, 1938
- Deporaus sandakanensis Voss, 1922
- Deporaus scolocnemoides Voss, 1935
- Deporaus seminiger Reitter, 1880
- Deporaus semiruber Marshall, 1948
- Deporaus semirufus Fst., 1898
- Deporaus separandus Voss, 1935
- Deporaus sericans Voss, 1938
- Deporaus sericeus Voss, 1935
- Deporaus serratissimus Voss, 1922
- Deporaus sichuanensis Alonso-Zarazaga
- Deporaus signatus Voss, 1922
- Deporaus simillimus Voss, 1938
- Deporaus singularis Voss, 1938
- Deporaus slamatensis Voss, 1935
- Deporaus smaragdinus Voss, 1935
- Deporaus socius Faust, 1887
- Deporaus socius Voss, 1938
- Deporaus solitarius Voss, 1938
- Deporaus solutus Voss, 1938
- Deporaus spec Voss, 1942
- Deporaus spinipes Voss, 1938
- Deporaus strigellus Alonso-Zarazaga
- Deporaus subclathratus Voss, 1938
- Deporaus subcoarctatus Voss, 1942
- Deporaus subcoarctus Voss, 1938
- Deporaus sublimbatus Voss, 1957
- Deporaus subrugaticollis Voss, 1941
- Deporaus subseriatopilosus Voss, 1938
- Deporaus subtilis Voss, 1938
- Deporaus subviridis Voss, 1938
- Deporaus sulcifrons Voss, 1922
- Deporaus taeniatus Voss, 1922
- Deporaus tenuicornis Voss, 1938
- Deporaus testaceus Voss, 1922
- Deporaus tibialis Voss, 1922
- Deporaus tjambaicus Voss, 1938
- Deporaus tristis Faust, 1887
  - D. tristis Seidlitz, 1891, D. tristis Desbr.
- Deporaus tschungseni Alonso-Zarazaga
- Deporaus tumidus Voss, 1942
- Deporaus unicolor Faust, 1887
  - D. unicolor Kono, 1935, D. unicolor Legalov, 2003
- Deporaus unicolor Voss, 1938
- Deporaus uniformis Heller, 1922
- Deporaus ventralis Faust, 1894
- Deporaus virescenti-grisea Voss, 1938
- Deporaus weishanensis Legalov, 2007
- Deporaus xishamensis Alonso-Zarazaga
- Deporaus yunnanica Voss, 1930
- Deporaus yunnanicus Alonso-Zarazaga
