= Eugnamptus puncticeps =

Scientific classification
- Domain: Eukaryota
- Kingdom: Animalia
- Phylum: Arthropoda
- Class: Insecta
- Order: Coleoptera
- Suborder: Polyphaga
- Infraorder: Cucujiformia
- Family: Attelabidae
- Genus: Eugnamptus
- Species: E. puncticeps

Binomial name
- Eugnamptus puncticeps LeConte, 1876

Species of beetle

Eugnamptus puncticeps is a species of leaf rolling weevil in the beetle family Attelabidae. It is found in North America.
