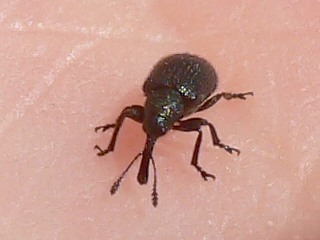

Scientific classification
- Domain: Eukaryota
- Kingdom: Animalia
- Phylum: Arthropoda
- Class: Insecta
- Order: Coleoptera
- Suborder: Polyphaga
- Infraorder: Cucujiformia
- Family: Attelabidae
- Genus: Neocoenorrhinus; Voss, 1952

= Neocoenorrhinus =

Genus of beetles

Neocoenorrhinus is a genus of beetles belonging to the family Attelabidae.

The species of this genus are found in Europe and Japan.

Species:

- Neocoenorrhinus abeillei Loges, 1869
- Neocoenorrhinus aeneovirens (Marsham, 1802)
- Neocoenorrhinus cuprinus Alonso-Zarazaga
- Neocoenorrhinus germanicus (Herbst, 1797)
- Neocoenorrhinus minutus Herbst, 1797
- Neocoenorrhinus pauxillus (Germar, 1824)
