= Merhynchites bicolor =

Scientific classification
- Kingdom: Animalia
- Phylum: Arthropoda
- Class: Insecta
- Order: Coleoptera
- Suborder: Polyphaga
- Infraorder: Cucujiformia
- Family: Attelabidae
- Genus: Merhynchites
- Species: M. bicolor

Binomial name
- Merhynchites bicolor (Fabricius, 1775)

Species of beetle

Merhynchites bicolor, the rose curculio, is a species of leaf rolling weevil in the beetle family Attelabidae. It is found in North America.

== Subspecies ==
These five subspecies belong to the species Merhynchites bicolor:

- Merhynchites bicolor bicolor
- Merhynchites bicolor cerdonis
- Merhynchites bicolor cockerelli Pierce, 1913
- Merhynchites bicolor niger Hamilton
- Merhynchites bicolor nigricephalus Hamilton, 1985
