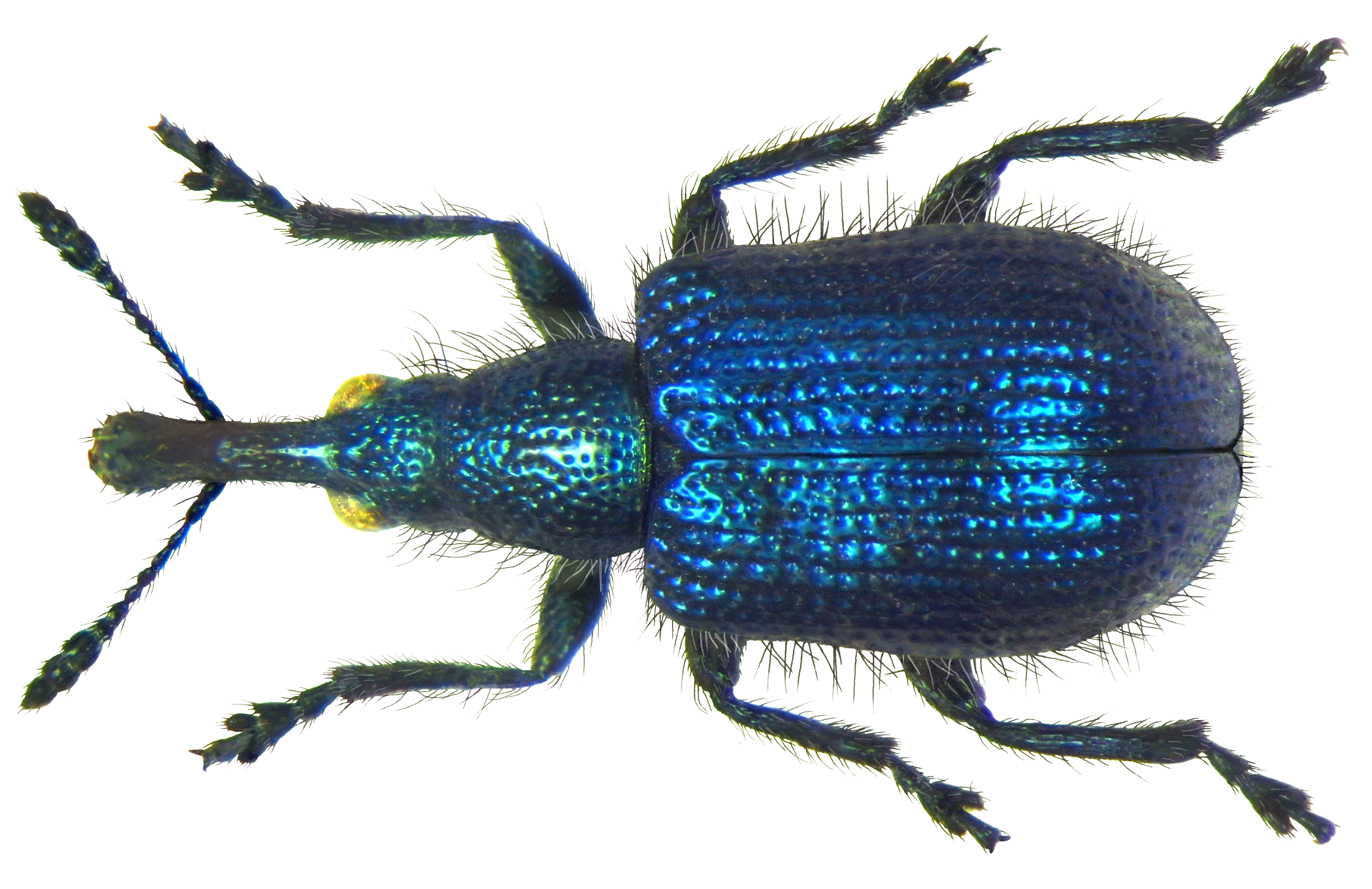
- Involvulus caeruleus

Scientific classification
- Kingdom: Animalia
- Phylum: Arthropoda
- Class: Insecta
- Order: Coleoptera
- Suborder: Polyphaga
- Infraorder: Cucujiformia
- Family: Attelabidae
- Tribe: Rhynchitini
- Genus: Involvulus; Schrank, 1798

= Involvulus =

Genus of beetles

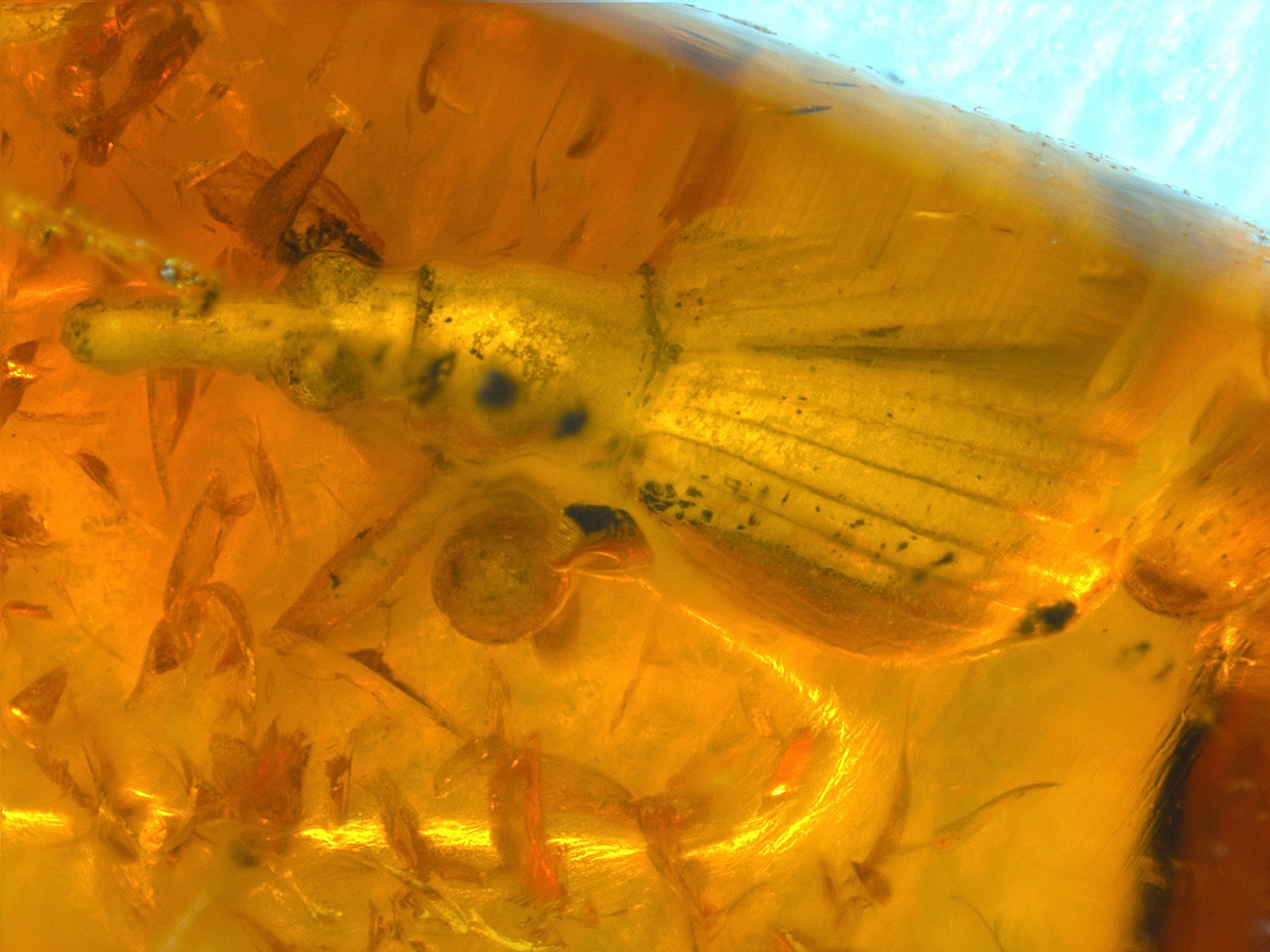
Involulus liquidus (holotype)

Involvulus is a genus of leaf and bud weevils in the beetle family Attelabidae. There are more than 40 described species in Involvulus. The genus was first described in 1798 by Franz von Paula Schrank who specified the type species as Involvulus metallicus which is considered to be Involvulus cupreus.

== Species ==
These and other species belong to the genus Involvulus:

- Involvulus aerosus Voss, 1958
- Involvulus aethiops Formánek, 1911
- Involvulus apionoidess Sharp, 1889)
- Involvulus asperulicollis Voss, 1956
- Involvulus baojiensis Legalov, 2007
- Involvulus berezovskyi (Legalov, 2007)
- Involvulus caeruleus (De Geer, 1775)
- Involvulus carinaticollis Voss, 1958
- Involvulus cinctellus Voss, 1956
- Involvulus cognatus Voss, 1958
- Involvulus commutatus Voss, 1969
- Involvulus conjunctulus Voss, 1959
- Involvulus continentalis Voss, 1958
- Involvulus coorgensis Voss, 1957
- Involvulus cupreus (Linnaeus & C., 1758)
- Involvulus dentatus Voss, 1953
- Involvulus dundai Alonso-Zarazaga
- Involvulus egenus (Voss, 1933)
- Involvulus foochowensis Voss, 1960
- Involvulus germanicus Kuhnt, 1911
- Involvulus hauseri Alonso-Zarazaga
- Involvulus hirtus (Fabricius, 1801)
- Involvulus immixtus Voss, 1969
- Involvulus intrusus Voss, 1957
- Involvulus iranensis Alonso-Zarazaga
- Involvulus kangdingensis Alonso-Zarazaga
- Involvulus kaszabi Voss, 1956
- Involvulus kozlovi Alonso-Zarazaga
- Involvulus legalovi Alonso-Zarazaga, 2011
- Involvulus liesenfeldti Voss, 1956
- Involvulus liquidus Voss, 1957
- Involvulus maduranus Voss, 1955
- Involvulus nalandaicus Voss
- Involvulus nathani Voss, 1957
- Involvulus nigrocyaneus Alonso-Zarazaga
- Involvulus parilis Voss, 1956
- Involvulus potanini Alonso-Zarazaga
- Involvulus przhevalskyi Alonso-Zarazaga
- Involvulus pubescens (J.C.Fabricius, 1775)
- Involvulus rottensis Zherikhin, 1992
- Involvulus schochrini Alonso-Zarazaga
- Involvulus semiruberrimus Voss, 1969
- Involvulus setosellus Voss, 1962
- Involvulus siwalikensis Voss, 1956
- Involvulus szechuanensis Voss, 1956
- Involvulus teldeniyana Voss, 1957
- Involvulus wegneri Voss, 1957
- Involvulus xiahensis Alonso-Zarazaga
- Involvulus zhondiensis Alonso-Zarazaga
