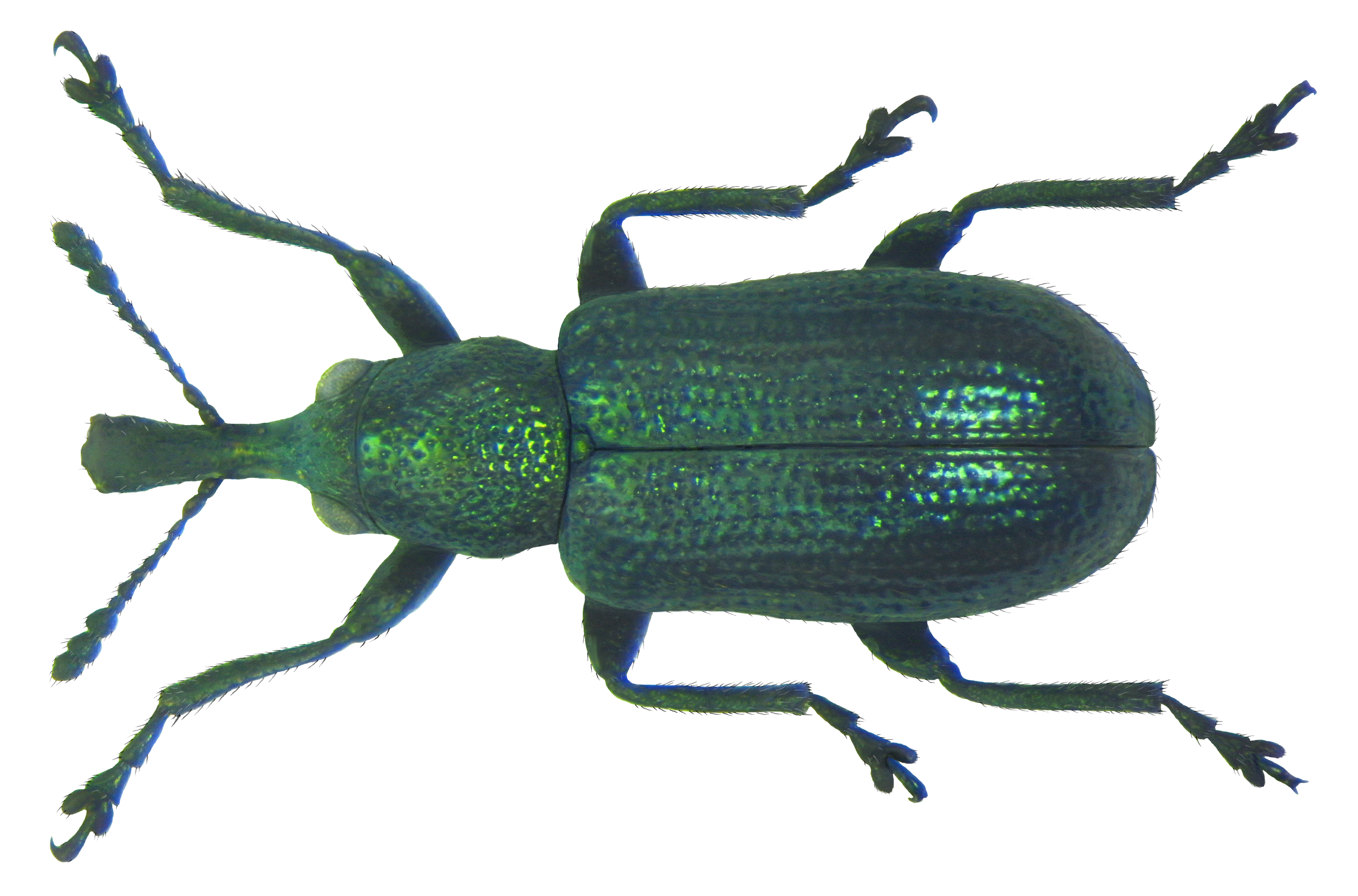

Scientific classification
- Domain: Eukaryota
- Kingdom: Animalia
- Phylum: Arthropoda
- Class: Insecta
- Order: Coleoptera
- Suborder: Polyphaga
- Infraorder: Cucujiformia
- Family: Attelabidae
- Genus: Temnocerus; Thunberg, 1815

= Temnocerus =

Genus of beetles

Temnocerus is a genus of beetles belonging to the family Attelabidae.

The species of this genus are found in Europe and Northern America.

Species:

- Temnocerus abdominalis Legalov, 2003
- Temnocerus aeratoides Legalov, 2003
