= Merhynchites =

- Merhynchites wickhami.

Scientific classification
- Kingdom: Animalia
- Phylum: Arthropoda
- Clade: Pancrustacea
- Class: Insecta
- Order: Coleoptera
- Suborder: Polyphaga
- Infraorder: Cucujiformia
- Superfamily: Curculionoidea
- Family: Attelabidae
- Tribe: Rhynchitini
- Genus: Merhynchites; Sharp, 1889

Genus of beetles

Merhynchites is a genus of leaf and bud weevils in the beetle family Attelabidae. There are about 12 described species in Merhynchites.

== Species ==
These 12 species belong to the genus Merhynchites:

- Merhynchites bicolor (Fabricius, 1775) (rose curculio)
- Merhynchites cockerelli Pierce, 1913
- Merhynchites creticus Voss, 1955
- Merhynchites hungaricus Sharp, 1889
- Merhynchites palmi Hamilton, 1979
- Merhynchites palmii (Schaeffer, 1905)
- Merhynchites piceus Pierce, 1913
- Merhynchites ruber Fairmaire
- Merhynchites tricarinatus (Green, 1920)
- Merhynchites ventralis Pierce, 1913
- Merhynchites viridilustrans Pierce, 1913
- Merhynchites wickhami (Cockerell, 1912) (western rose curculio)
