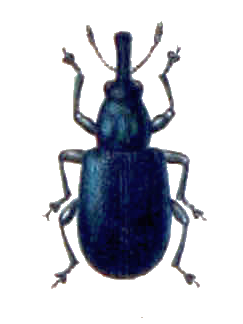
- Auletobius sanguisorbae

Scientific classification
- Domain: Eukaryota
- Kingdom: Animalia
- Phylum: Arthropoda
- Class: Insecta
- Order: Coleoptera
- Suborder: Polyphaga
- Infraorder: Cucujiformia
- Family: Attelabidae
- Subfamily: Rhynchitinae
- Genus: Auletobius; Desbrochers, 1869

= Auletobius =

Genus of beetles

Auletobius is a genus of leaf and bud weevils in the family Attelabidae. There are at least 220 described species in Auletobius.

== See also ==
- List of Auletobius species
