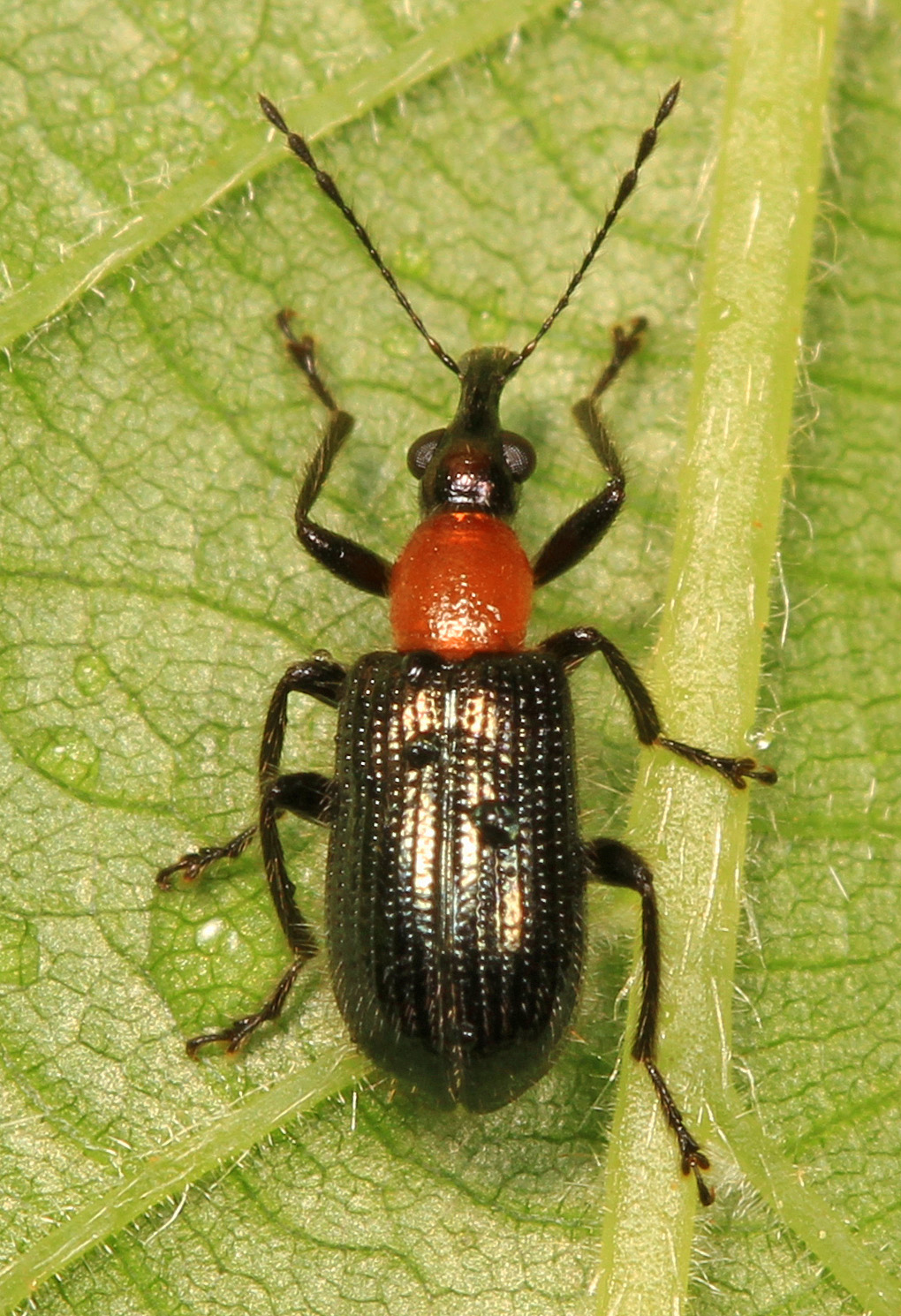

Scientific classification
- Domain: Eukaryota
- Kingdom: Animalia
- Phylum: Arthropoda
- Class: Insecta
- Order: Coleoptera
- Suborder: Polyphaga
- Infraorder: Cucujiformia
- Family: Attelabidae
- Tribe: Rhynchitini
- Genus: Eugnamptus; Schönherr, 1839

Diversity
- at least 170 species

= Eugnamptus =

Genus of beetles

Eugnamptus is a genus of leaf and bud weevils in the beetle family Attelabidae. There are more than 170 described species in Eugnamptus.

== See also ==
- List of Eugnamptus species
