= A. auratus =

A. auratus may refer to:

- Abacetus auratus, a ground beetle found in the Central African Republic
- Anolis auratus, the grass anole, a lizard found in Central and South America
- Anthrenus auratus, a carpet beetle found in Uzbekistan
- Attelabus auratus, a weevil found in Central America
