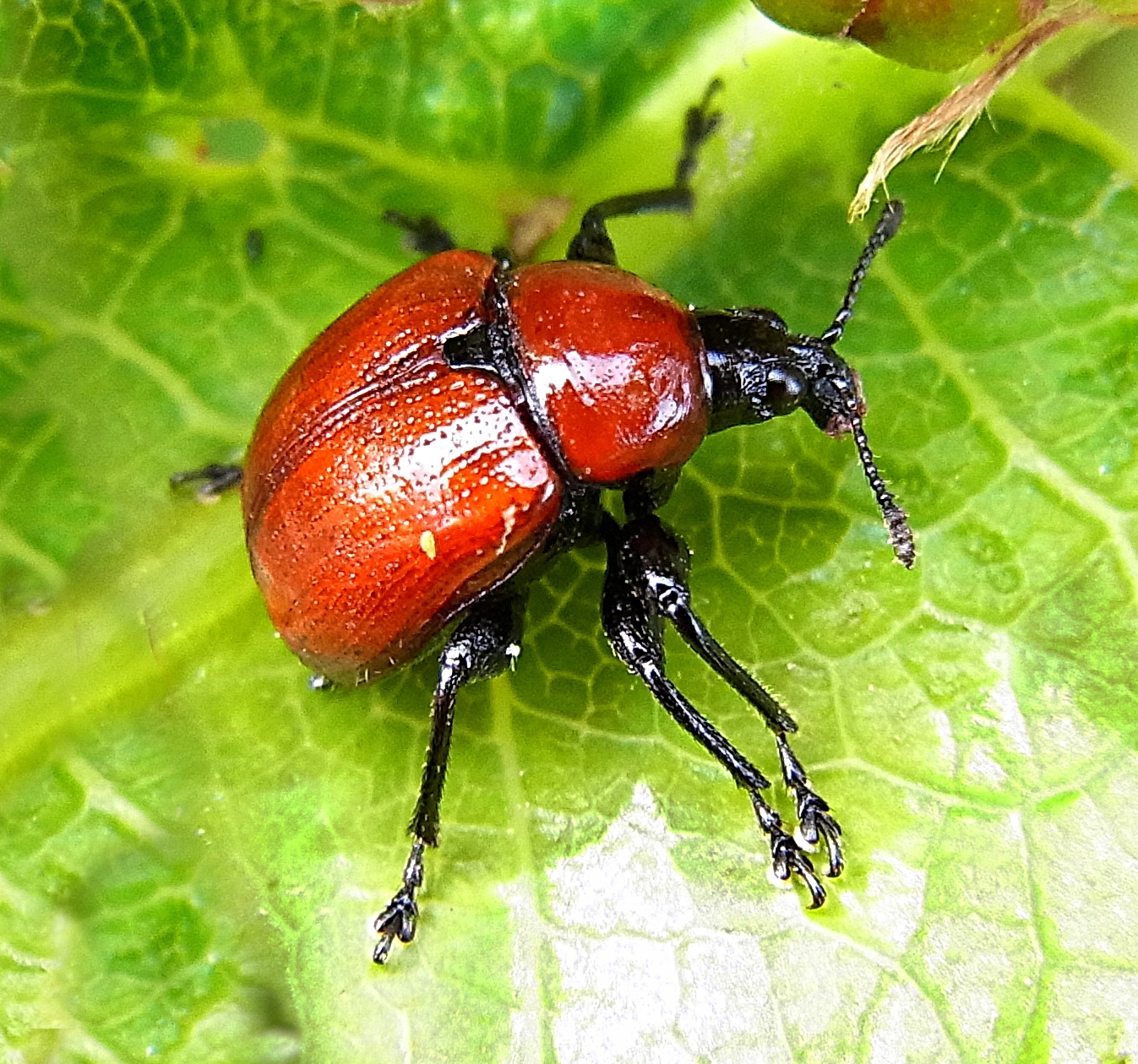
- Attelabus nitens

Scientific classification
- Kingdom: Animalia
- Phylum: Arthropoda
- Class: Insecta
- Order: Coleoptera
- Suborder: Polyphaga
- Infraorder: Cucujiformia
- Family: Attelabidae
- Subfamily: Attelabinae
- Genus: Attelabus
- Species: A. nitens

Binomial name
- Attelabus nitens Voss, 1925

= Attelabus nitens =

Species of beetle

Attelabus nitens is a species of leaf-rolling weevil in the beetle family Attelabidae, found in Europe. Commonly known as the oak leaf-roller, it derives its name from the female's behavior of rolling itself in oak leaves after laying an egg.

== Gallery ==
Oak roller weevil (Attelabus nitens) on oak leaf

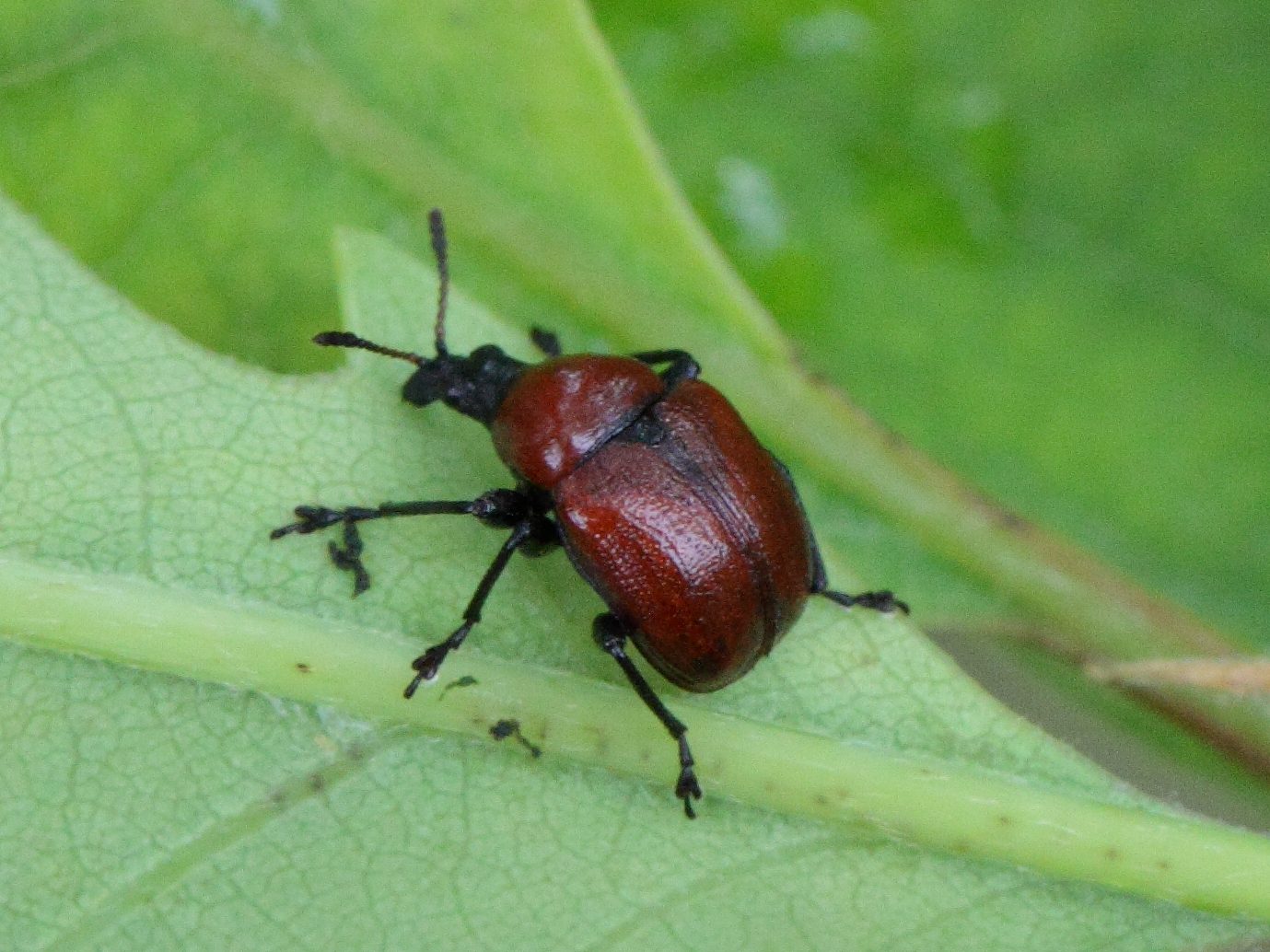
Attelabus nitens
