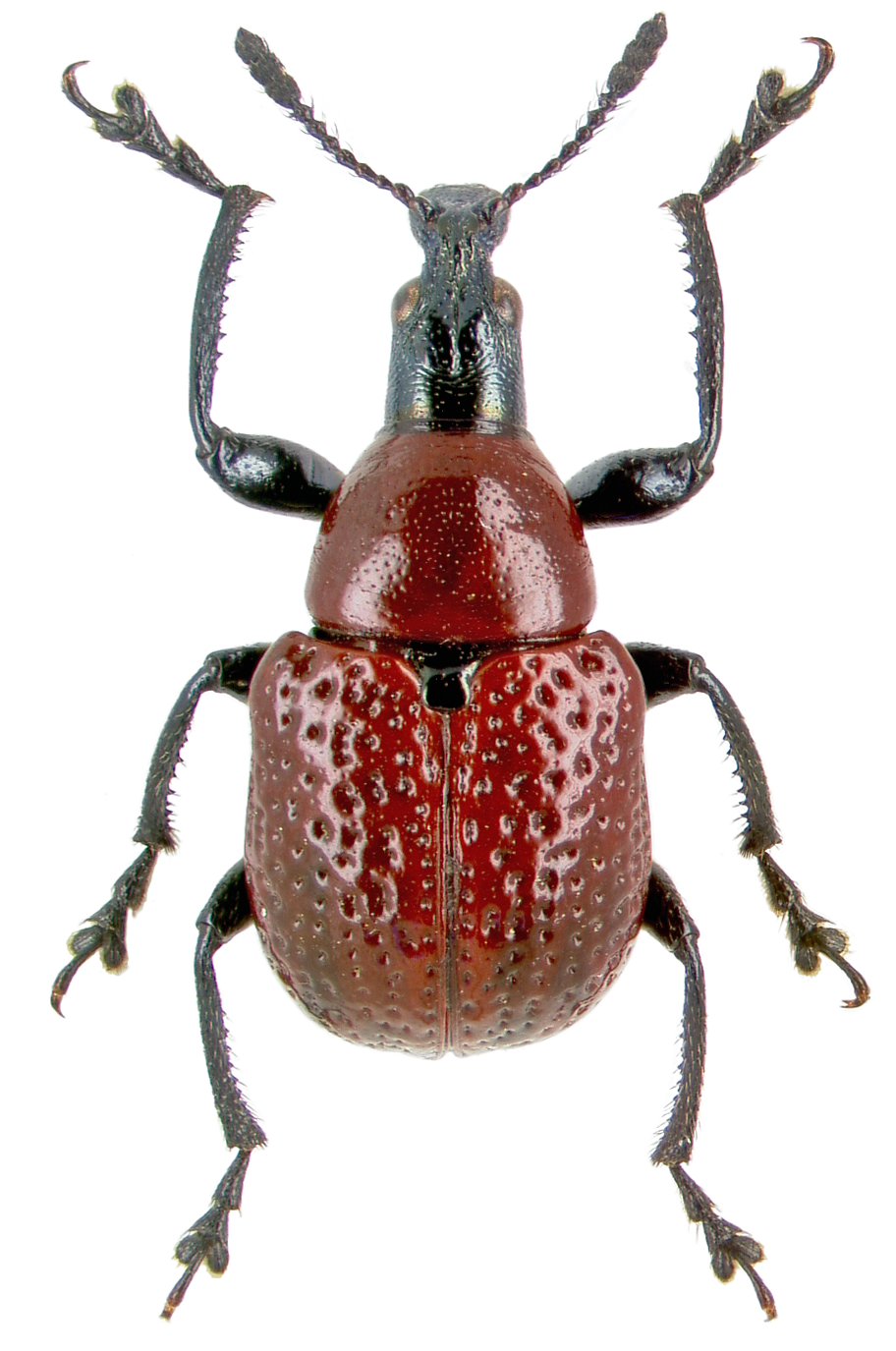
- Attelabus variolosus

Scientific classification
- Kingdom: Animalia
- Phylum: Arthropoda
- Clade: Pancrustacea
- Class: Insecta
- Order: Coleoptera
- Suborder: Polyphaga
- Infraorder: Cucujiformia
- Superfamily: Curculionoidea
- Family: Attelabidae
- Subfamily: Attelabinae
- Genus: Attelabus; Linnaeus, 1758

Synonyms
- Cyphus

= Attelabus =

Genus of beetles

Attelabus nitens on oak leaf

Attelabus is a genus of weevils belonging to the family Attelabidae.

== Species ==
These species are members of the genus Attelabus, found in Europe.

- Attelabus abdominalis Angelov, 1964
- Attelabus abyssinicus Hustache, 1923
- Attelabus aeneus
- Attelabus aequatus
- Attelabus algoensis Mshl., 1906
- Attelabus alliariae Fabricius & J.C., 1801
- Attelabus alvearius Turton, 1802
- Attelabus amitinus Voss, 1932
- Attelabus ammios
- Attelabus amplectens Mannerheim, 1833
- Attelabus angulatus
- Attelabus angulipennis Sharp, 1889
- Attelabus angulosus Gyllenhal, 1833
- Attelabus anserinus Gyllenhal, 1833
- Attelabus armatus Gyllenhal, 1833
- Attelabus asparagi
- Attelabus asperipennis Fairm., 1898
- Attelabus astragali
- Attelabus ater
- Attelabus atratus Fabricius & J.C., 1801
- Attelabus atricornis Muls., 1855
- Attelabus atrirostris Fabricius & J.C., 1802
- Attelabus auratus
- Attelabus aureolus Gyllenhal, 1833
- Attelabus avellanae
- Attelabus axillaris
- Attelabus azureus Olivier, 1807
- Attelabus bacchus
- Attelabus badius Say
- Attelabus balcanicus
- Attelabus betuleti
- Attelabus bicolor Gmelin & J.F., 1790
- Attelabus bicoloratus Turton, 1802
- Attelabus bifasciatus
- Attelabus bifoveatus Jekel, 1860
- Attelabus biguttatus Fabricius & J.C., 1801
- Attelabus bihastatus Frivaldszky, 1892
- Attelabus bimaculatus
- Attelabus binotatus
- Attelabus bipustulatus
- Attelabus bipustulosus Jekel, 1860
- Attelabus breviceps Sharp, 1889
- Attelabus brevicollis Sharp, 1889
- Attelabus bullatus Sharp, 1889
- Attelabus buqueti Jekel, 1860
- Attelabus calibatus R.Townson, 1797
- Attelabus callosus Sharp, 1889
- Attelabus canaliculatus
- Attelabus carbonicolor Voss, 1927
- Attelabus carneolus
- Attelabus castaneicolor Jekel, 1860
- Attelabus chalybaeus
- Attelabus championi Sharp, 1889
- Attelabus christophi
- Attelabus chrysidius Pascoe, 1886
- Attelabus cicatricosus Motsch., 1860
- Attelabus ciodes
- Attelabus coccineus
- Attelabus coccolobae Wolcott, 1924
- Attelabus coeruleocephalus Panzer, 1805
- Attelabus coeruleus
- Attelabus columbinus Erichson, 1848
- Attelabus concolor Leoni, 1905
- Attelabus conicollis Sharp, 1889
- Attelabus conicus Illiger, 1807
- Attelabus constrictipennis Chittenden, 1926
- Attelabus coquereli Fairm., 1871
- Attelabus corallinus Gyllenhal, 1839
- Attelabus corallipes Pascoe, 1883
- Attelabus corniculatus
- Attelabus corvinus
- Attelabus costipennis Fahrs., 1871
- Attelabus costulatus Jekel, 1860
- Attelabus crabroniformis
- Attelabus craccae
- Attelabus cribrarius Olivier, 1807
- Attelabus cribricollis Jekel, 1860
- Attelabus crotalariae Fabricius & J.C., 1801
- Attelabus cruralis Sharp, 1889
- Attelabus cupreus
- Attelabus cupricollis
- Attelabus cupripennis Perty, 1832
- Attelabus cuprirostris Fabricius & J.C., 1801
- Attelabus curculioniformis Dalla Torre & Voss, 1930
- Attelabus curculionoides
- Attelabus cyaenus
- Attelabus cyanellus Voss, 1925
- Attelabus cyaneoviridis Hustache, 1923
- Attelabus cyaneus
- Attelabus cyanipennis Jekel, 1860
- Attelabus cygneus Fabricius & J.C., 1801
- Attelabus cylindricus Stephens, 1831
- Attelabus dajacus Heller, 1922
- Attelabus dauricus
- Attelabus deceptor Jekel, 1860
- Attelabus dejardinii Guérin-Méneville
- Attelabus deletangi Hustache, 1924
- Attelabus denigratus
- Attelabus dentipennis
- Attelabus dentipes
- Attelabus diffinis Sharp, 1889
- Attelabus discolor
- Attelabus disparipes Chittenden, 1926
- Attelabus distinctus Sharp, 1889
- Attelabus dorsalis Dejean, 1821
- Attelabus dromedarius Faust, 1883
- Attelabus dubius
- Attelabus duodecimpunctatus
- Attelabus durus
- Attelabus efferans R.Townson, 1797
- Attelabus elongaticeps Voss, 1924
- Attelabus erythropterus
- Attelabus exaratus
- Attelabus falcata Jekel, 1860
- Attelabus falcatus Guérin-Méneville, 1833
- Attelabus falcipes Klug, 1825
- Attelabus fasciatus
- Attelabus fascicollis Reitter, 1916
- Attelabus feae Faust, 1894
- Attelabus femoralis
- Attelabus femoratus Olivier, 1807
- Attelabus fenestratus Sharp, 1889
- Attelabus flavicornis Fabricius & J.C., 1801
- Attelabus flavipes
- Attelabus formicaroides
- Attelabus fornicatus Olivier, 1807
- Attelabus fossor
- Attelabus foveicollis Dallas, 1867
- Attelabus foveipennis
- Attelabus foveolatus Gyllenhal, 1833
- Attelabus frumentarius
- Attelabus fulvitarsis Jekel, 1860
- Attelabus funereus L.Ponza, 1805
- Attelabus fuscicornis
- Attelabus fuscirostris
- Attelabus gemmatus
- Attelabus genalis J.L.Leconte, 1876
- Attelabus geoffroyanus
- Attelabus gestroi Faust, 1894
- Attelabus giganteus Faust, 1882
- Attelabus glaber
- Attelabus globosus
- Attelabus gnomoides White, 1841
- Attelabus hamatus Olivier, 1807
- Attelabus heterocerus Sharp, 1889
- Attelabus hirtus Fabricius & J.C., 1801
- Attelabus hispanicus Jekel, 1860
- Attelabus holosericeus Dejean
- Attelabus humeralis Klug, 1825
- Attelabus humerosus Faust, 1894
- Attelabus hungaricus Fabricius & J.C., 1802
- Attelabus hypomelas Fairm., 1878
- Attelabus hystrix Fabricius & J.C., 1801
- Attelabus ichneumonius
- Attelabus ignitus Schoenherr, 1826
- Attelabus ilicis Costa, 1839
- Attelabus inaequalis Sharp, 1889
- Attelabus indicus
- Attelabus indigaceus Pascoe, 1883
- Attelabus intermedius
- Attelabus ircutensis
- Attelabus jekeli Kirsch, 1870
- Attelabus klugi Gyll.In Schonherr, 1839
- Attelabus klugii
- Attelabus lacertosus Marshall, 1923
- Attelabus laesicollis
- Attelabus laetus Cristofori & Jan, 1832
- Attelabus lepturoides Illiger
- Attelabus lewisi Sharp, 1889
- Attelabus ligulatus Sharp, 1889
- Attelabus lineaticollis Dejean, 1830
- Attelabus lizeri Hustache, 1924
- Attelabus longiclava Sharp, 1889
- Attelabus longicollis
- Attelabus longimanus
- Attelabus longirostris Jekel, 1860
- Attelabus lythri Panzer, 1794
- Attelabus maculatus
- Attelabus maculipes Villa & Villa, 1833
- Attelabus malaccensis Heller, 1922
- Attelabus malvae
- Attelabus marci
- Attelabus marginalis Pic, 1916
- Attelabus marginatus
- Attelabus melancoryphus Germar, 1824
- Attelabus melanocephalus Dejean, 1821
- Attelabus melanocoryphus Jekel, 1860
- Attelabus melanopygus Sharp, 1889
- Attelabus melanurus
- Attelabus monoceros
- Attelabus morio Jekel, 1860
- Attelabus mundanus Sharp, 1889
- Attelabus munroi Marshall, 1932
- Attelabus mutabilis Jekel, 1860
- Attelabus mutillarius
- Attelabus mutus
- Attelabus nanus
- Attelabus nigriclava Sharp, 1889
- Attelabus nigricornis Klug, 1825
- Attelabus nigripennis
- Attelabus nigripes
- Attelabus nigrirostris
- Attelabus nigriventris Schilsky, 1906
- Attelabus nitens Voss, 1925
- Attelabus nitensiformis Kono, 1927
- Attelabus nitidus Jekel, 1860
- Attelabus notatus
- Attelabus nourricheli Leoni, 1905
- Attelabus obliquus Heller, 1908
- Attelabus obscurior Pic, 1898
- Attelabus obsidianus Voss, 1925
- Attelabus octomaculatus
- Attelabus octopunctatus
- Attelabus octospilotus Jekel, 1860
- Attelabus ovalis F.Weber, 1801
- Attelabus ovatus Fabricius & J.C., 1801
- Attelabus palliatus Leoni, 1905
- Attelabus pectoralis Thunberg, 1813
- Attelabus perrieri Fairm., 1898
- Attelabus piceovirens Jekel, 1860
- Attelabus pisi Fabricius & J.C., 1801
- Attelabus placidus Jekel, 1860
- Attelabus planirostris Fabricius & J.C., 1801
- Attelabus polita Roelofs, 1874
- Attelabus politus Gebler, 1825
- Attelabus polymorphus
- Attelabus pomonae
- Attelabus populi
- Attelabus pseudosuturalis Ter-Minasian, 1952
- Attelabus pubescens
- Attelabus pulchellus Suffr., 1870
- Attelabus pulvinicollis Jekel, 1860
- Attelabus punctatostriata Motsch., 1860
- Attelabus punctatus Olivier, 1807
- Attelabus punctiger
- Attelabus purpureus
- Attelabus pustula Ancey, 1881
- Attelabus quadratus Sharp, 1889
- Attelabus quadrimaculatus
- Attelabus quadripustulatus Fabricius & J.C., 1801
- Attelabus quadrispinosus
- Attelabus regularis Faust, 1883
- Attelabus rhinomacer Ill., 1805
- Attelabus rhois
- Attelabus rostratus
- Attelabus rubricollis Reitter, 1916
- Attelabus rubrodorsatus Fairm., 1898
- Attelabus rudis
- Attelabus rufescens Dejean, 1830
- Attelabus ruficollis
- Attelabus rufipennis Sharp, 1889
- Attelabus rufipes Schilsky, 1903
- Attelabus rufirostris
- Attelabus rufus Fabricius & J.C., 1801
- Attelabus rugicollis Jekel, 1860
- Attelabus ruginotus Fairm., 1899
- Attelabus sandacanus Heller, 1922
- Attelabus sanguineus
- Attelabus sanguinipennis Hope
- Attelabus schaefferi
- Attelabus scutellaris Say, 1826
- Attelabus scutellatus Gyllenhal, 1833
- Attelabus sedatus Sharp, 1889
- Attelabus sellatus
- Attelabus senex Pallas, 1773
- Attelabus serraticornis
- Attelabus serripes Germar
- Attelabus sexguttatus
- Attelabus sexmaculatus Chevr., 1876
- Attelabus sexplagiatus Heller, 1922
- Attelabus similis Kirby, 1837
- Attelabus simulatus Marshall, 1923
- Attelabus smeraldinus Costa, 1827
- Attelabus smithi Sharp, 1889
- Attelabus sorbi
- Attelabus speciosus
- Attelabus spectator Marshall, 1932
- Attelabus sphageus
- Attelabus spiculatus Auriv., 1891
- Attelabus spinicollis Dejean, 1821
- Attelabus spinifex Olivier, 1807
- Attelabus spinipes Schilsky, 1906
- Attelabus spinosus
- Attelabus splendens
- Attelabus striatus Klug
- Attelabus subcyaneus Voss, 1931
- Attelabus sulcifrons
- Attelabus sumptuosus Gory, 1834
- Attelabus surinamensis
- Attelabus suturalis Voss, 1925
- Attelabus tranquebaricus
- Attelabus trapezicollis Heller, 1922
- Attelabus tricolor Kirsch, 1874
- Attelabus tristis
- Attelabus troglodytes Jekel, 1860
- Attelabus tuberculosus Fahrs., 1871
- Attelabus tuberifer Jekel, 1860
- Attelabus unicolor
- Attelabus unifasciatus
- Attelabus uniformis Heller, 1908
- Attelabus variabilis
- Attelabus variegatus Dejean, 1830
- Attelabus variolosus Fabricius & J.C., 1802
- Attelabus vernalis
- Attelabus verrucifer Jekel, 1860
- Attelabus versicolor Costa, 1839
- Attelabus vestitus
- Attelabus viciae
- Attelabus vinosus Sharp, 1889
- Attelabus violaceus Jekel, 1860
- Attelabus viridans Gyllenhal, 1839
- Attelabus wagneri Hustache, 1926
