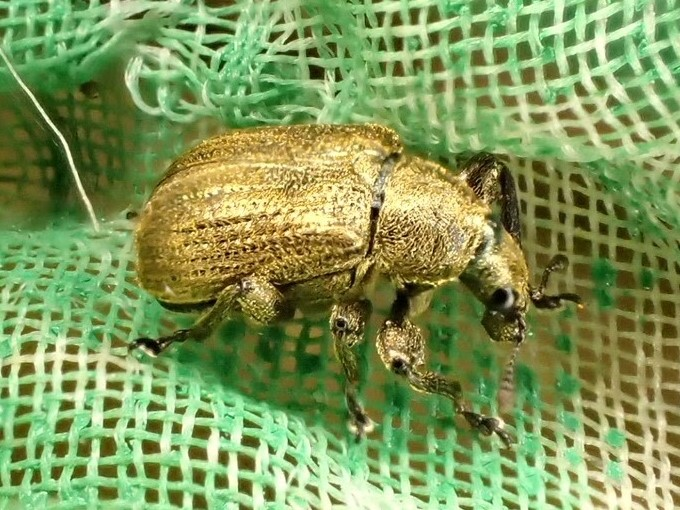
- Himatolabus cupreus

Scientific classification
- Domain: Eukaryota
- Kingdom: Animalia
- Phylum: Arthropoda
- Class: Insecta
- Order: Coleoptera
- Suborder: Polyphaga
- Infraorder: Cucujiformia
- Family: Attelabidae
- Subfamily: Attelabinae
- Genus: Himatolabus; Jekel, 1860

= Himatolabus =

Genus of beetles

Himatolabus is a genus of leaf-rolling weevils in the beetle family Attelabidae. There are about 16 described species in Himatolabus.

== Species ==
These 16 species belong to the genus Himatolabus:

- Himatolabus axillaris (Gyllenhal, 1839)
- Himatolabus burleyi Hamilton
- Himatolabus chujoi Kôno, 1939
- Himatolabus coloradoensis Voss, 1925
- Himatolabus cupreus Voss, 1925
- Himatolabus maculatus Voss, 1929
- Himatolabus nudus Hamilton
- Himatolabus pubescens (Say, 1826)
- Himatolabus rhois Voss, 1925
- Himatolabus rudis Voss, 1925
- Himatolabus subpilosus Voss, 1925
- Himatolabus umbosis Hamilton
- Himatolabus vestitus Voss, 1925
- Himatolabus vinosus Voss, 1925
- Himatolabus viometallicus Hamilton
- Himatolabus vogti Hamilton
