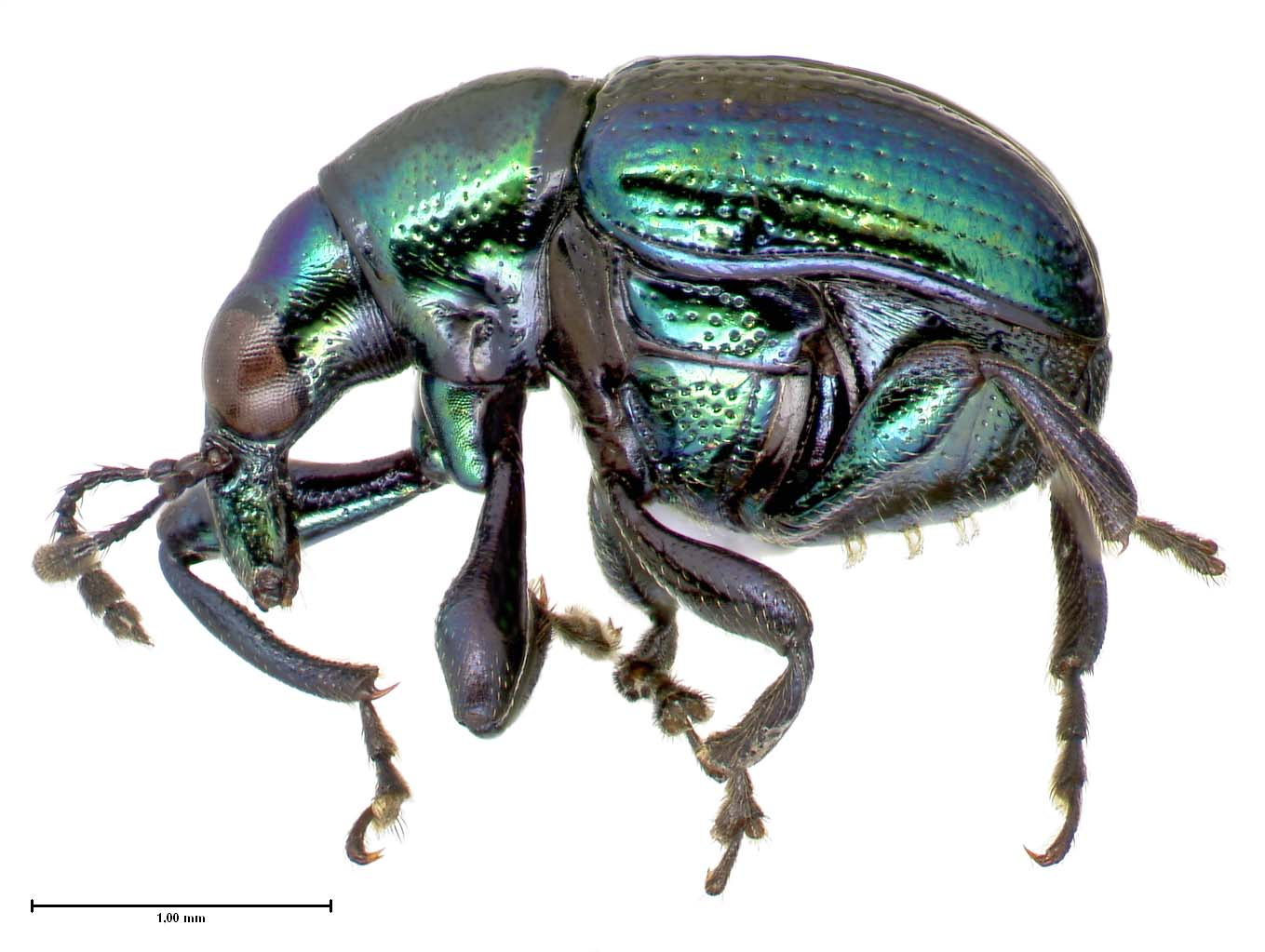
- Female Euops from New Guinea

Scientific classification
- Kingdom: Animalia
- Phylum: Arthropoda
- Clade: Pancrustacea
- Class: Insecta
- Order: Coleoptera
- Suborder: Polyphaga
- Infraorder: Cucujiformia
- Superfamily: Curculionoidea
- Family: Attelabidae
- Subfamily: Attelabinae
- Genus: Euops; Schönherr, 1839

= Euops =

Genus of beetles

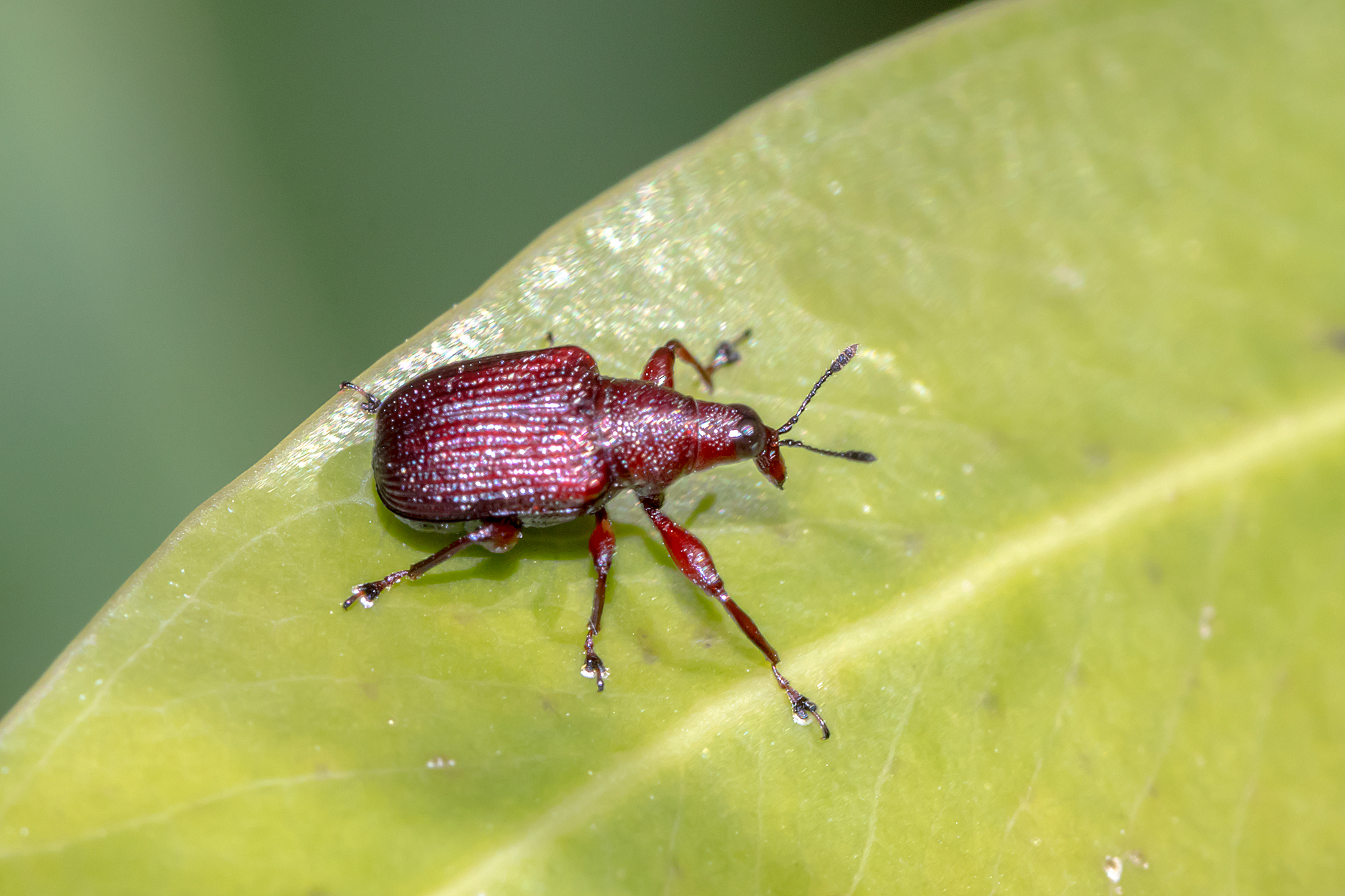
Euops falcatus, Australia

Euops is a genus of the leaf-rolling weevils (family Attelabidae) containing more than 300 species. It is spread over most tropical and subtropical regions but is missing from America. The centre of its radiation is New Guinea and Australia where it is the only representative of the subfamily Attelabinae.

Females of Euops have mycangia in the space between metathorax and abdomen. Leaf rolls prepared for oviposition are inoculated with spores from these mycangia. Moreover, the leaf-rolls are treated by the female using abdominal setose brushes that in most species apply secretions of unknown function. The fungus growing on a thus treated leaf-roll does not improve its nutritional value but may play a role as an antagonist of other microbes potentially harmful to the weevil larva.
