= Pterocolus =

Scientific classification
- Domain: Eukaryota
- Kingdom: Animalia
- Phylum: Arthropoda
- Class: Insecta
- Order: Coleoptera
- Suborder: Polyphaga
- Infraorder: Cucujiformia
- Family: Attelabidae
- Subfamily: Pterocolinae
- Genus: Pterocolus; Say, 1831

Genus of beetles

Pterocolus is a genus of thief weevils in the beetle order Coleoptera. There are about 16 described species in Pterocolus.

== Species ==
These 16 species belong to the genus Pterocolus:

- Pterocolus amandae Hamilton
- Pterocolus angelae Hamilton
- Pterocolus auricollis Sharp, 1890
- Pterocolus azureus Voss, 1943
- Pterocolus bicolor Hamilton
- Pterocolus crinomucrosus Hamilton
- Pterocolus gravidus Legalov, 2007
- Pterocolus grossus Sharp, 1890
- Pterocolus jennae Hamilton
- Pterocolus minutus Hamilton
- Pterocolus moraguesi Rheinheimer, 2012
- Pterocolus ovatus (Fabricius, 1801) (thief weevil)
- Pterocolus pueblensis Legalov, 2007
- Pterocolus torreyae Hamilton
- Pterocolus truncatus Hamilton
- Pterocolus tuberculatus Hamilton
