= Xestolabus =

Scientific classification
- Domain: Eukaryota
- Kingdom: Animalia
- Phylum: Arthropoda
- Class: Insecta
- Order: Coleoptera
- Suborder: Polyphaga
- Infraorder: Cucujiformia
- Family: Attelabidae
- Subfamily: Attelabinae
- Genus: Xestolabus; Jekel, 1860

Genus of beetles

Xestolabus is a genus of leaf-rolling weevils in the beetle family Attelabidae. There are at least 30 described species in Xestolabus.

== Species ==
These 30 species belong to the genus Xestolabus:

- Xestolabus angustifrons Voss, 1925
- Xestolabus biplagiatus Voss, 1951
- Xestolabus brevicollis Voss, 1925
- Xestolabus brunnescens Voss, 1925
- Xestolabus brunneus Voss, 1925
- Xestolabus cearensis Voss, 1951
- Xestolabus centomyrciae Voss, 1925
- Xestolabus chalceus Voss, 1957
- Xestolabus clinolaboides Voss, 1938
- Xestolabus conicollis Voss, 1925
- Xestolabus constrictipennis (Chittenden, 1926)
- Xestolabus corvinus Voss, 1925
- Xestolabus fulvitarsis Voss, 1925
- Xestolabus heterocerus Voss, 1925
- Xestolabus jatahyensis Voss, 1925
- Xestolabus laesicollis Voss, 1925
- Xestolabus lepidus Voss, 1930
- Xestolabus longiclava Voss, 1925
- Xestolabus melanopygus Voss, 1925
- Xestolabus mutabilis Voss, 1925
- Xestolabus nitidus Voss, 1925
- Xestolabus piceovirens Voss, 1925
- Xestolabus rubellus Voss, 1925
- Xestolabus schirmi Voss, 1953
- Xestolabus sedatus Voss, 1925
- Xestolabus tabaci Voss, 1925
- Xestolabus tabascoensis Voss, 1925
- Xestolabus troglodytes Voss, 1925
- Xestolabus venezolensis Janczyk, 1960
- Xestolabus violaceus Voss, 1925
