= Attelabus sexmaculatus =

Scientific classification
- Domain: Eukaryota
- Kingdom: Animalia
- Phylum: Arthropoda
- Class: Insecta
- Order: Coleoptera
- Suborder: Polyphaga
- Infraorder: Cucujiformia
- Family: Attelabidae
- Genus: Attelabus
- Species: A. sexmaculatus

Binomial name
- Attelabus sexmaculatus Chevr., 1876

Synonyms
- Euscelus sexmaculatus (Chevrolat); Chryseuscelus sexmaculatus (Chevrolat, 1876)

Species of beetle

Attelabus sexmaculatus is a species of weevil in the family Attelabidae. It was first described by Louis Alexandre Auguste Chevrolat in 1876.
