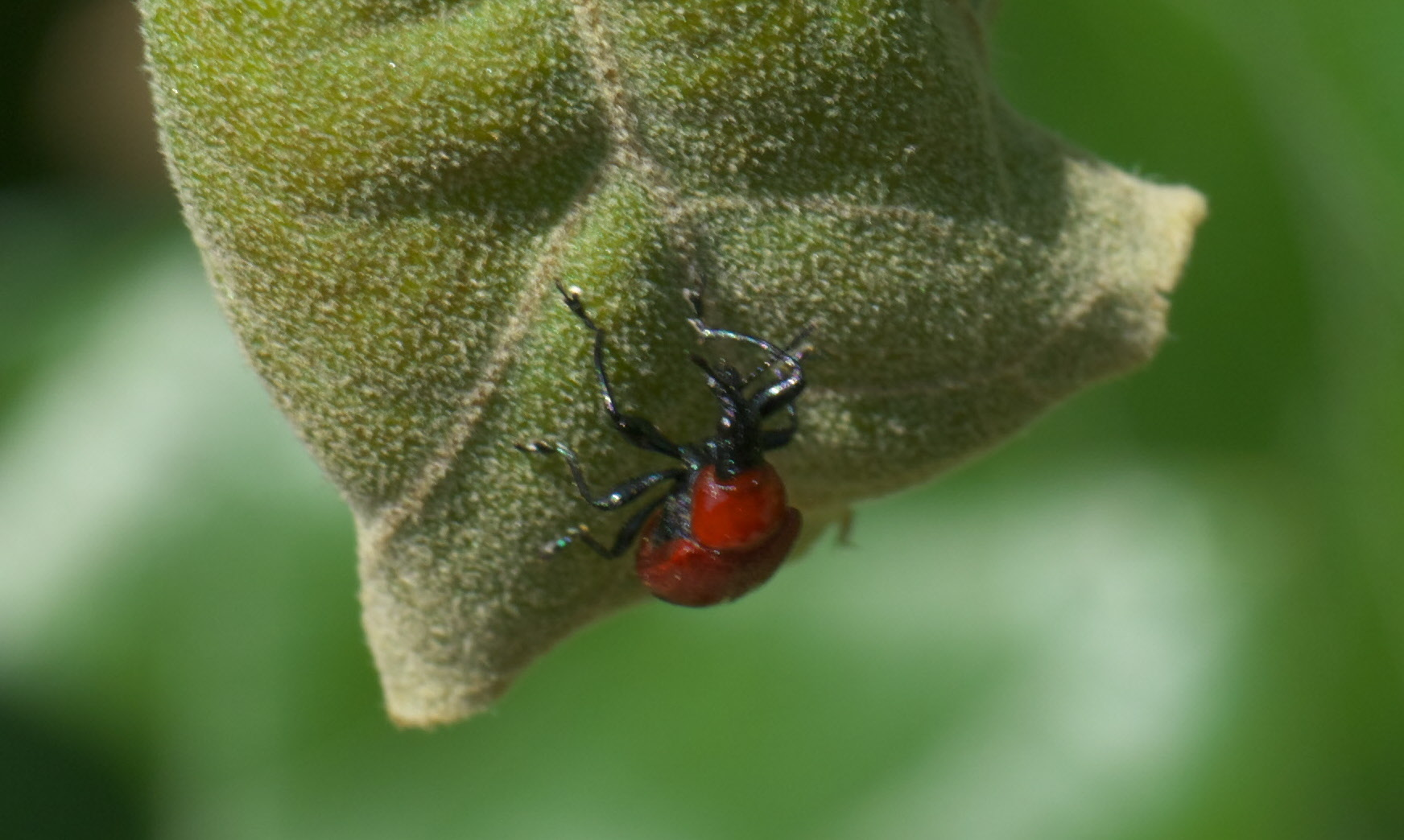

Scientific classification
- Kingdom: Animalia
- Phylum: Arthropoda
- Clade: Pancrustacea
- Class: Insecta
- Order: Coleoptera
- Suborder: Polyphaga
- Infraorder: Cucujiformia
- Superfamily: Curculionoidea
- Family: Attelabidae
- Genus: Homoeolabus
- Species: H. analis

Binomial name
- Homoeolabus analis (Illiger, 1794)

= Homoeolabus analis =

Species of beetle

Homoeolabus analis, known generally as the leaf-rolling weevil or oak leaf rolling weevil, is a species of leaf-rolling weevil in the family of beetles known as Attelabidae. The leaf roll of an Attelabidae beetle is referred to as a nidus (plural, niduses or nidi)—the Latin word for 'nest'. The process of constructing the leaf roll is termed "nidification". The main purpose of a leaf roll is to keep the eggs safe during the gestation period. It is found in North America. It is often preyed upon by the obligate egg predator and nest thief; Thief Weevil.

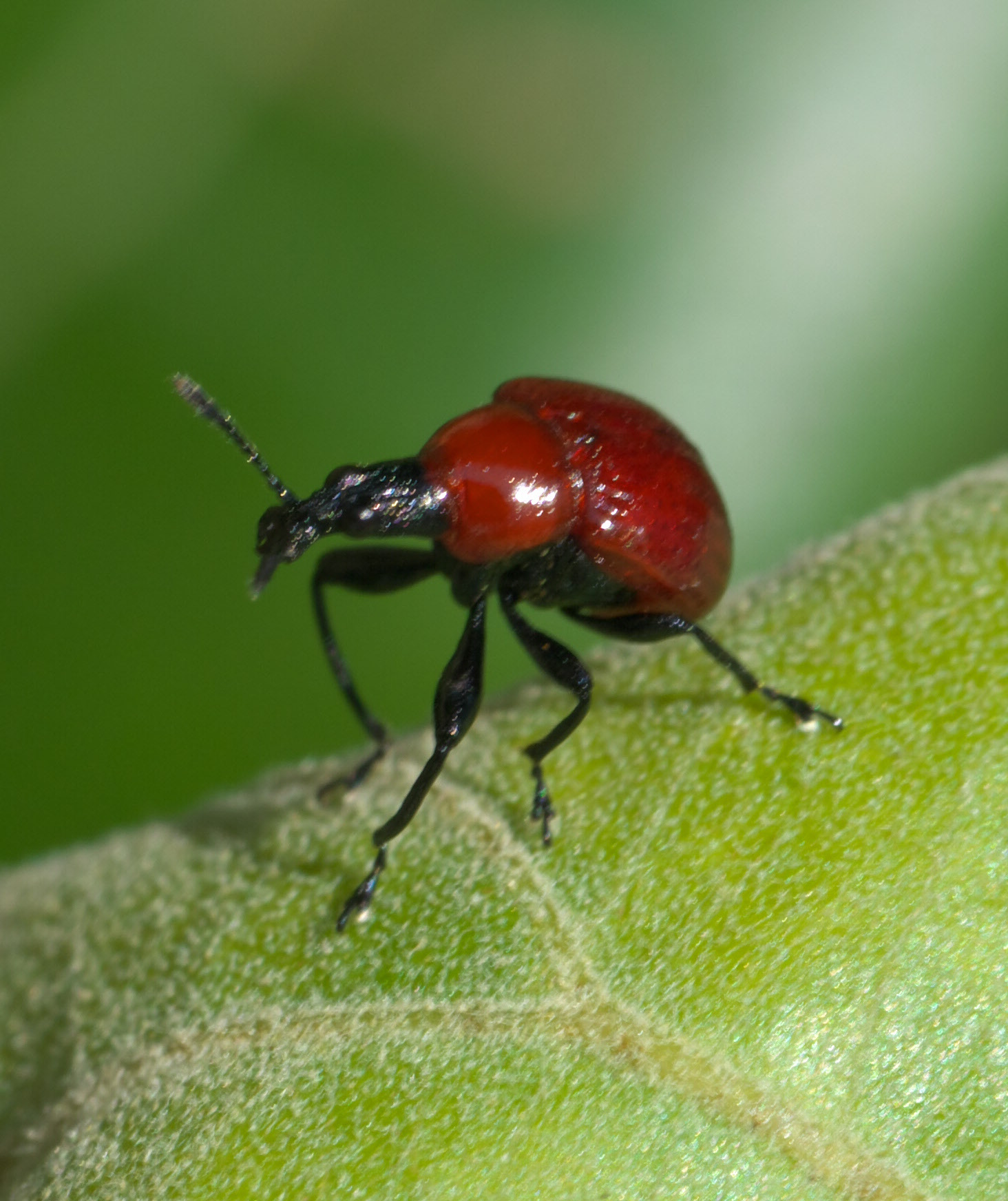
Leaf-rolling weevil, Homoeolabus analis
