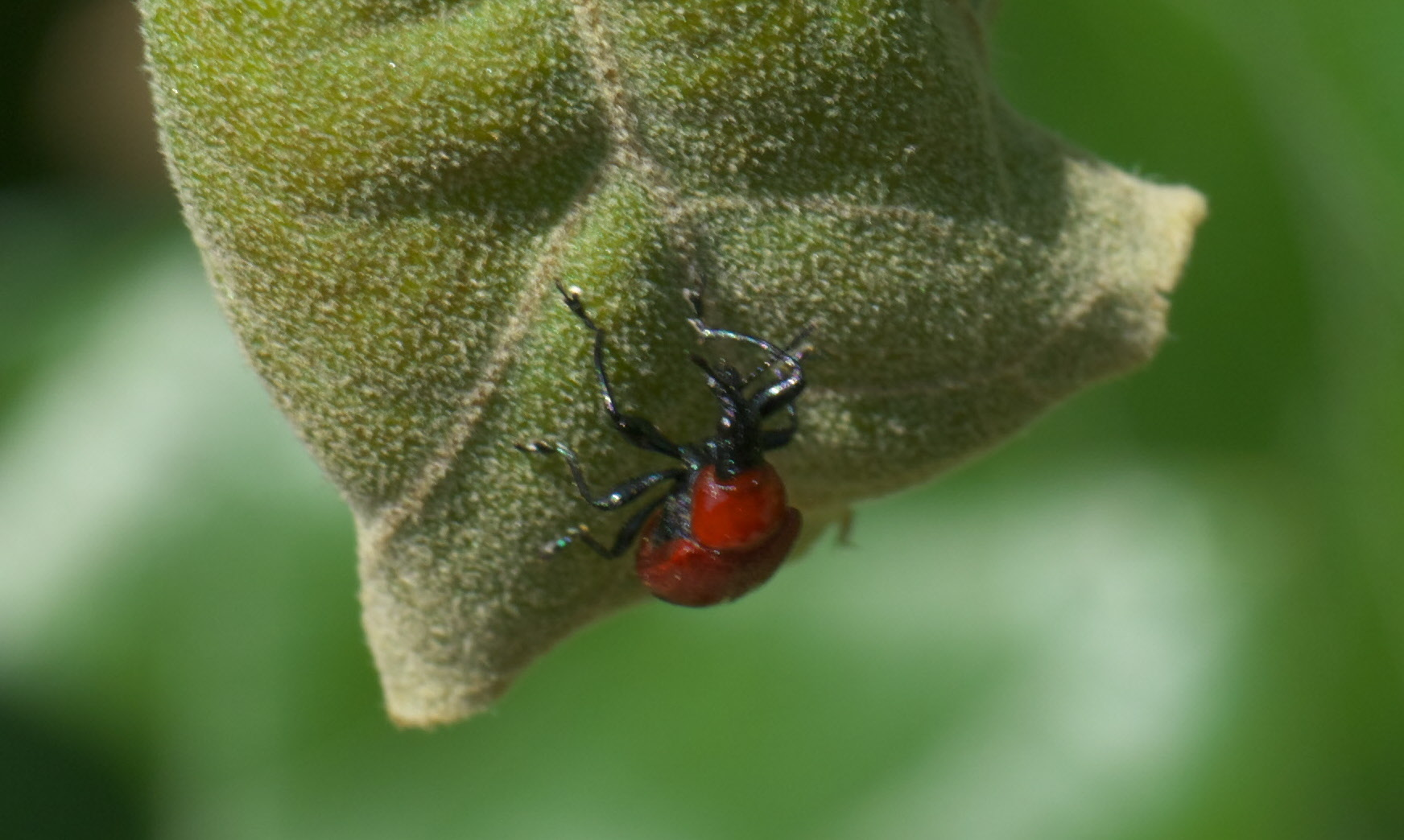
- Homoeolabus analis

Scientific classification
- Domain: Eukaryota
- Kingdom: Animalia
- Phylum: Arthropoda
- Class: Insecta
- Order: Coleoptera
- Suborder: Polyphaga
- Infraorder: Cucujiformia
- Family: Attelabidae
- Subfamily: Attelabinae
- Genus: Homoeolabus; Jekel, 1860

= Homoeolabus =

Genus of beetles

Homoeolabus is a genus of leaf-rolling weevils in the beetle family Attelabidae. There are at least two described species in Homoeolabus.

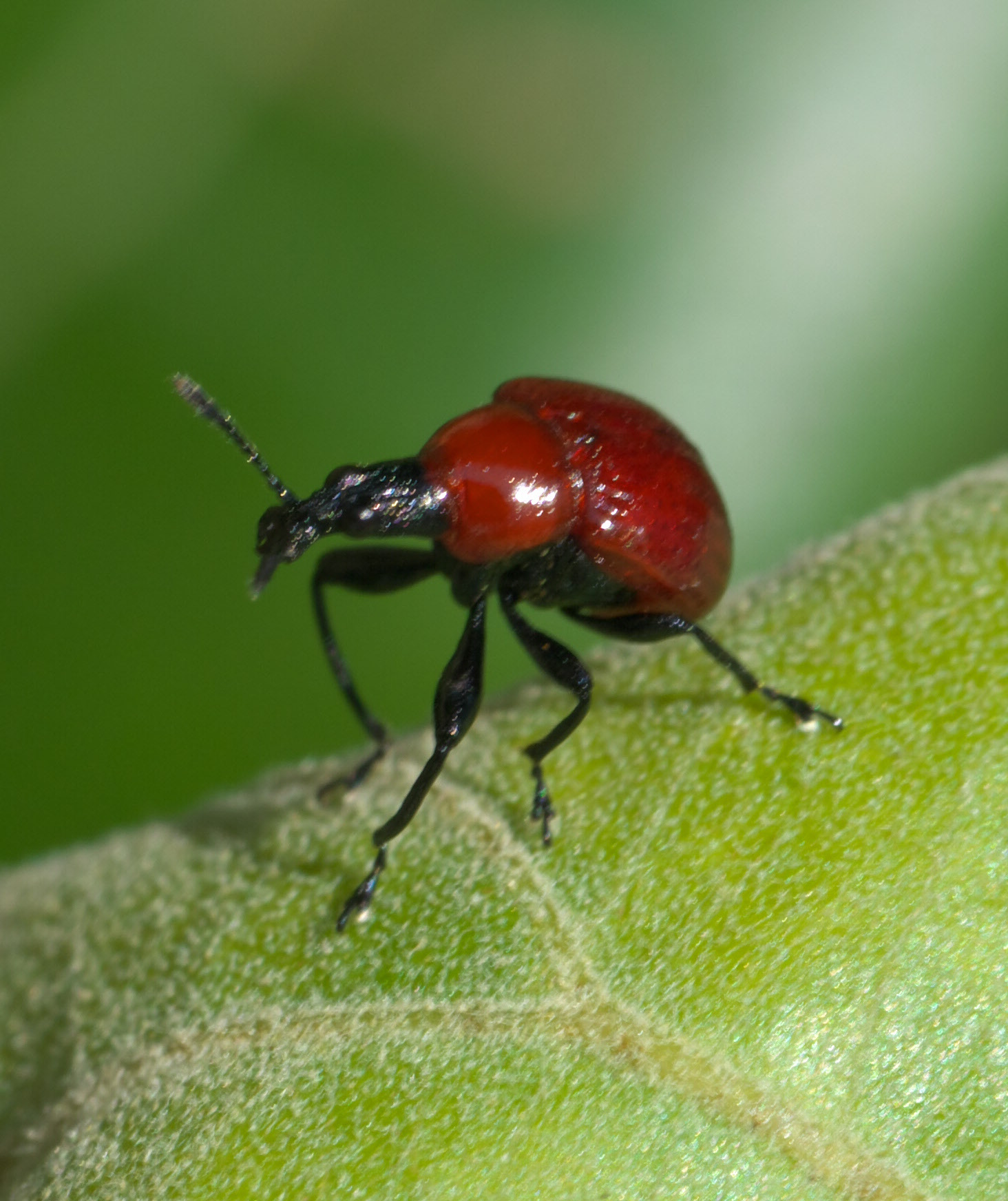
Homoeolabus analis

== Species ==
These two species belong to the genus Homoeolabus:

- Homoeolabus analis (Illiger, 1794) (leaf-rolling weevil)
- Homoeolabus similis Kirby, 1837
