= Pterocolus ovatus =

Scientific classification
- Domain: Eukaryota
- Kingdom: Animalia
- Phylum: Arthropoda
- Class: Insecta
- Order: Coleoptera
- Suborder: Polyphaga
- Infraorder: Cucujiformia
- Family: Attelabidae
- Genus: Pterocolus
- Species: P. ovatus

Binomial name
- Pterocolus ovatus (Fabricius, 1801)

Species of beetle

Pterocolus ovatus, known generally as the thief weevil or leaf roll thief, is a species of thief weevil in the family of beetles known as Attelabidae. It is found in North America. The thief weevil is an obligate egg predator and nest thief of Homoeolabus analis, the Oak Leaf-Rolling Weevil.
