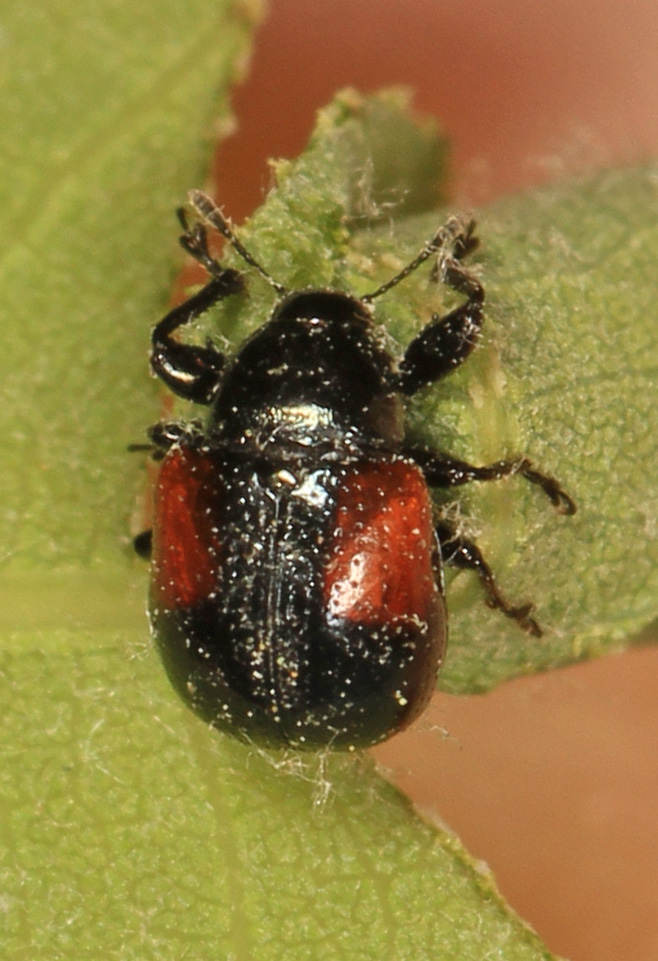
- Synolabus bipustulatus

Scientific classification
- Domain: Eukaryota
- Kingdom: Animalia
- Phylum: Arthropoda
- Class: Insecta
- Order: Coleoptera
- Suborder: Polyphaga
- Infraorder: Cucujiformia
- Family: Attelabidae
- Subfamily: Attelabinae
- Genus: Synolabus; Jekel, 1860

= Synolabus =

Genus of beetles

Synolabus is a genus of leaf-rolling weevils in the family of beetles known as Attelabidae. There are at least two described species in Synolabus.

== Species ==
These two species belong to the genus Synolabus:

- Synolabus bipustulatus (Fabricius, 1776)^{g b} (oak leafrolling weevil)
- Synolabus nigripes (LeConte, 1824)^{c b}

Data sources: i = ITIS, c = Catalogue of Life, g = GBIF, b = Bugguide.net
