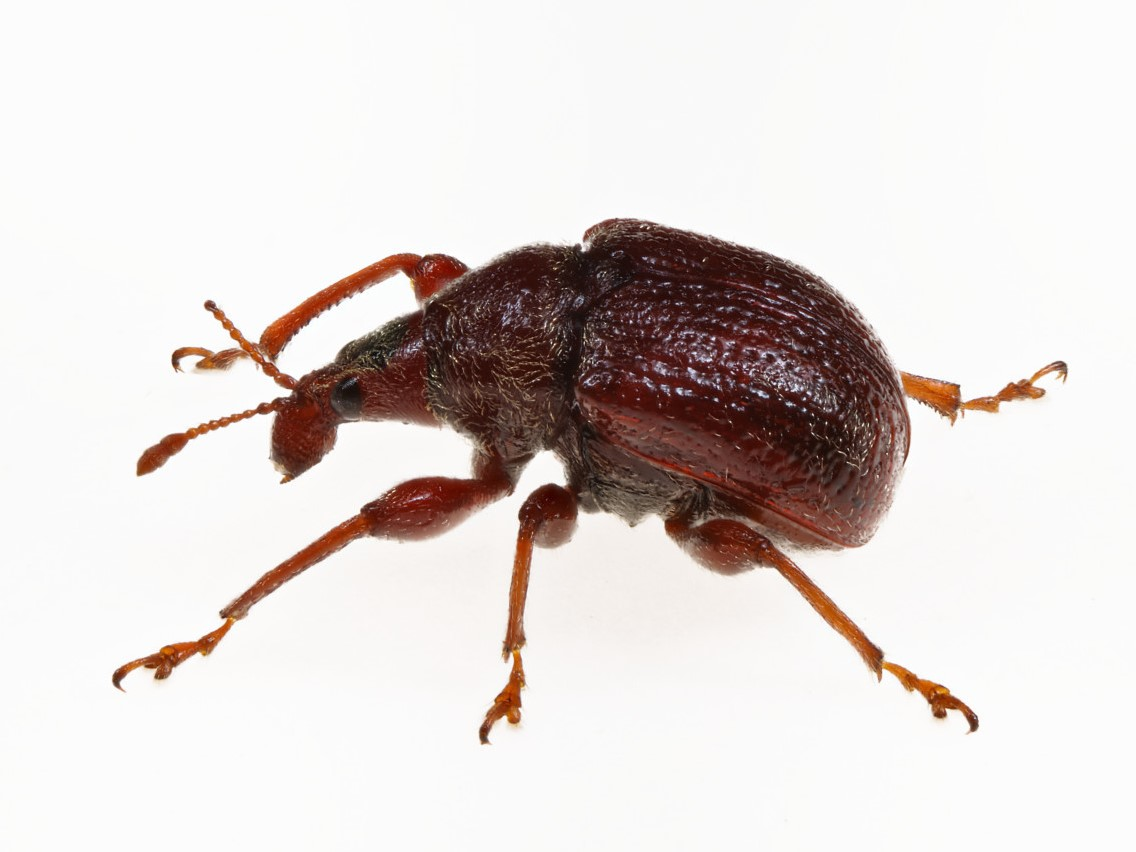

Scientific classification
- Domain: Eukaryota
- Kingdom: Animalia
- Phylum: Arthropoda
- Class: Insecta
- Order: Coleoptera
- Suborder: Polyphaga
- Infraorder: Cucujiformia
- Family: Attelabidae
- Genus: Himatolabus
- Species: H. pubescens

Binomial name
- Himatolabus pubescens (Say, 1826)

= Himatolabus pubescens =

Species of beetle

Himatolabus pubescens is a species of leaf-rolling weevil in the beetle family Attelabidae. It is found in North America.
