= Xestolabus constrictipennis =

Scientific classification
- Domain: Eukaryota
- Kingdom: Animalia
- Phylum: Arthropoda
- Class: Insecta
- Order: Coleoptera
- Suborder: Polyphaga
- Infraorder: Cucujiformia
- Family: Attelabidae
- Genus: Xestolabus
- Species: X. constrictipennis

Binomial name
- Xestolabus constrictipennis (Chittenden, 1926)

Species of beetle

Xestolabus constrictipennis is a species of leaf-rolling weevil in the beetle family Attelabidae. It is found in North America.
