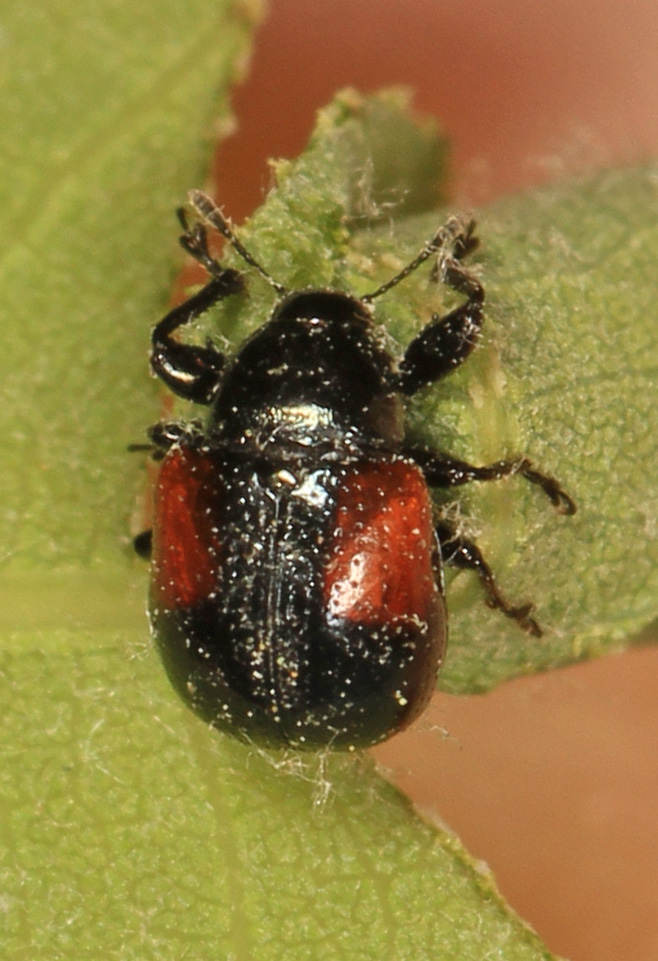

Scientific classification
- Domain: Eukaryota
- Kingdom: Animalia
- Phylum: Arthropoda
- Class: Insecta
- Order: Coleoptera
- Suborder: Polyphaga
- Infraorder: Cucujiformia
- Family: Attelabidae
- Genus: Synolabus
- Species: S. bipustulatus

Binomial name
- Synolabus bipustulatus (Fabricius, 1776)

= Synolabus bipustulatus =

Species of beetle

Synolabus bipustulatus, known generally as the oak leafrolling weevil or red spotted leaf-roller, is a species of leaf-rolling weevil in the family of beetles known as Attelabidae.
