= Lagenoderus =

Scientific classification
- Kingdom: Animalia
- Phylum: Arthropoda
- Class: Insecta
- Order: Coleoptera
- Suborder: Polyphaga
- Infraorder: Cucujiformia
- Family: Attelabidae
- Subfamily: Attelabinae
- Genus: Lagenoderus; White, 1841

Genus of beetles

Lagenoderus is a genus of leaf-rolling weevil that is noted for being strongly sexually dimorphic. Species of this genus are all known from Madagascar. Females of Lagenoderus had been assigned to a different genus, Phymatolabus Jekel, owing to confusion due to the species' sexually dimorphic nature.
