= Attelabus auratus =

Scientific classification
- Kingdom: Animalia
- Phylum: Arthropoda
- Class: Insecta
- Order: Coleoptera
- Suborder: Polyphaga
- Infraorder: Cucujiformia
- Family: Attelabidae
- Genus: Attelabus
- Species: A. auratus

Binomial name
- Attelabus auratus Sharp, 1889

Species of beetle

Attelabus auratus is a species of leaf and bud weevils belonging to the family Attelabidae.

== Description ==
Attelabus auratus can reach a length of about 5–6 millimetres (0.20–0.24 in). These weevils have a golden yellow coloration. Surface of thorax is finely rugose, with an angulated impression extending across the middle. Rostrum is quite short.

== Distribution ==
This species is present in Central America.
