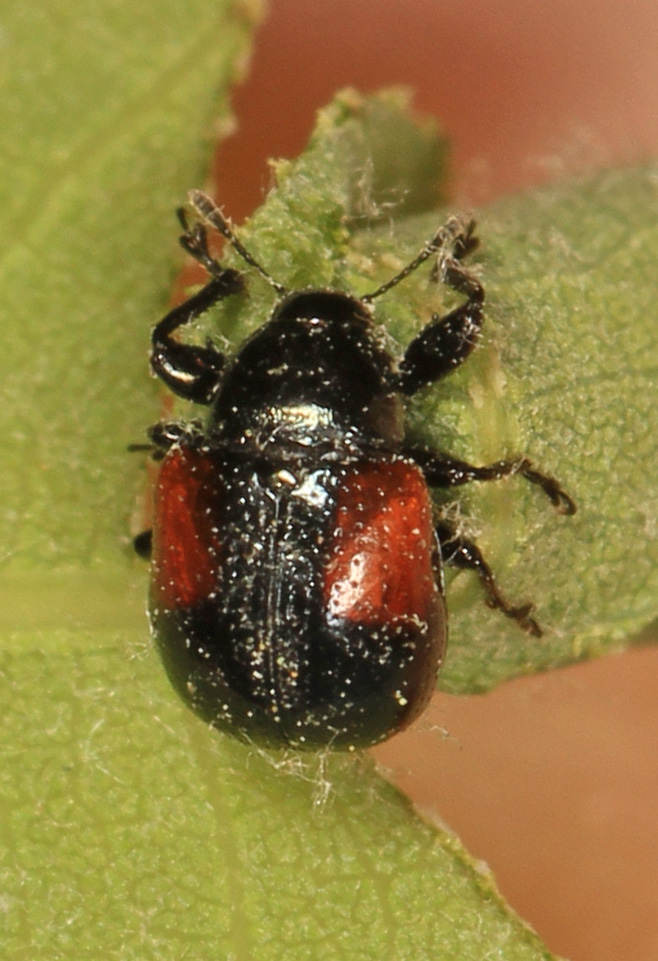
- Synolabus bipustulatus

Scientific classification
- Kingdom: Animalia
- Phylum: Arthropoda
- Clade: Pancrustacea
- Class: Insecta
- Order: Coleoptera
- Suborder: Polyphaga
- Infraorder: Cucujiformia
- Superfamily: Curculionoidea
- Family: Attelabidae
- Subfamily: Attelabinae; Billberg, 1820

Tribes
- Attelabini Billberg, 1820; Euopini Voss, 1925; Euscelophilini Voss, 1925; Lamprolabini Voss, 1925; Paramecolabini Legalov, 2003; Pilolabini Voss, 1925

= Attelabinae =

Subfamily of beetles

Attelabinae is a subfamily of leaf-rolling weevils in the beetle family Attelabidae. There are at least 20 genera and more than 690 described species in Attelabinae.

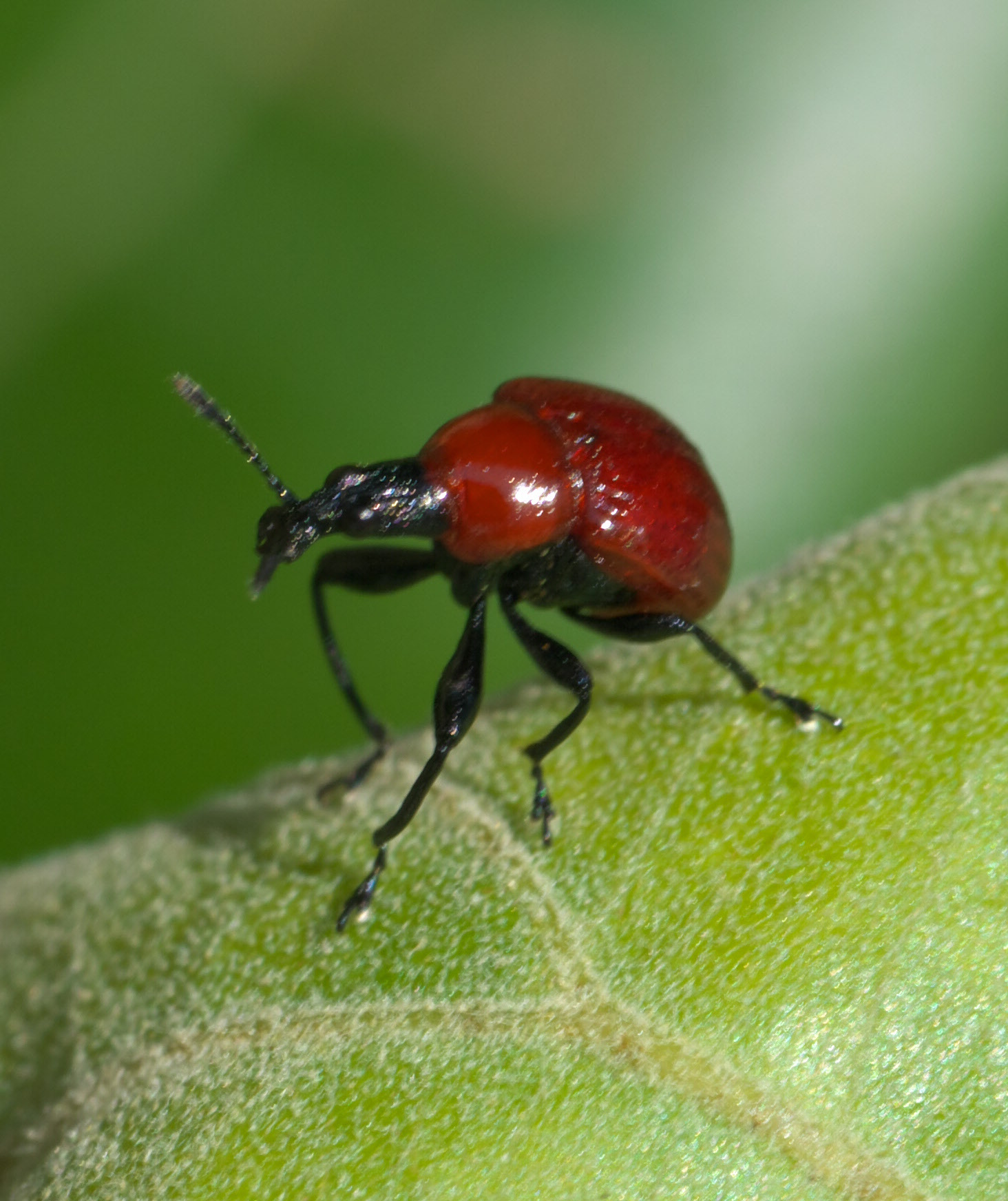
Homoeolabus analis

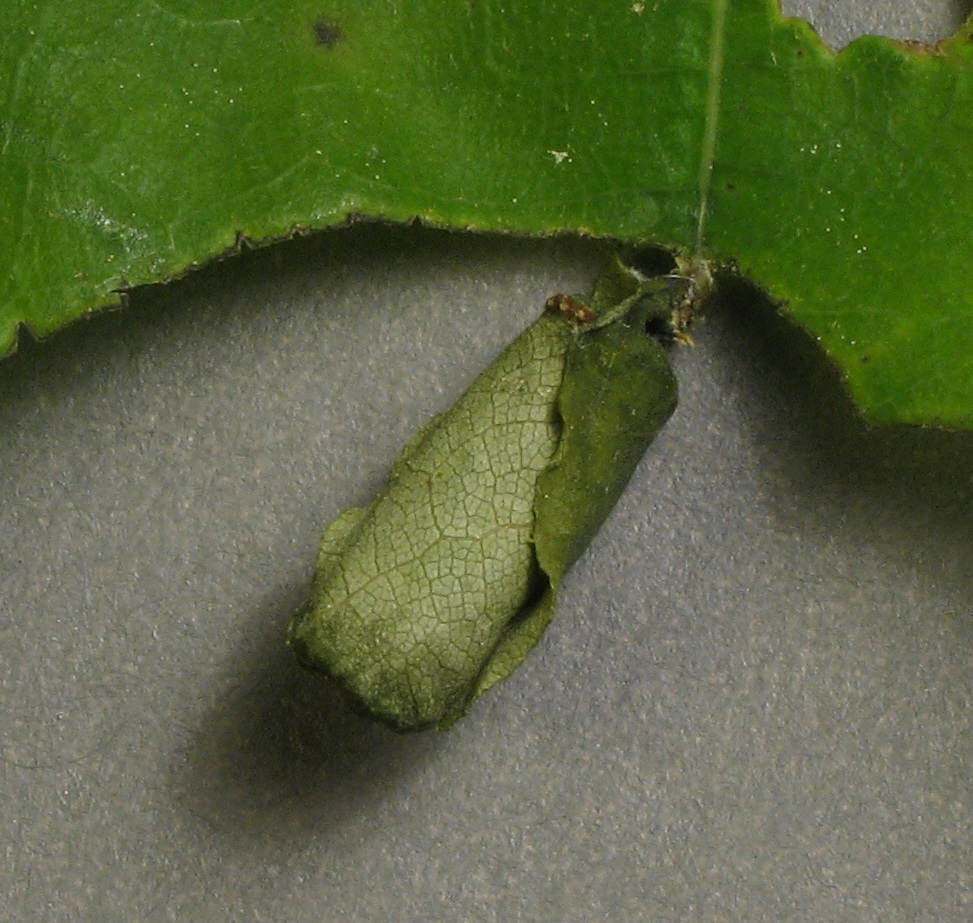
Leaf roll containing an egg of Attelabinae sp.

== Genera ==
These genera belong to the subfamily Attelabinae:

- Allolabus Voss, 1925
- Attelabus Linnaeus 1758
- Clinolabus Jekel, 1860
- Cyrtolabus Voss, 1925
- Euops Schoenherr, 1839
- Euscelophilus Voss, 1925
- Euscelus Germar, 1833
- Henicolabus Voss, 1925
- Heterolabus Jekel, 1860
- Himatolabus Jekel, 1860
- Homoeolabus Jekel, 1860
- Hybolabus Jekel, 1860
- Lagenoderus White, 1841
- Lamprolabus Jekel, 1860
- Omolabus Jekel, 1860
- Phialodes Roelofs 1874
- Phymatopsinus Voss, 1925
- Pilolabus Jekel, 1860
- Pseudopilolabus Legalov 2003
- Synolabus Jekel, 1860
- Xestolabus Jekel, 1860
